= BET-TR =

Romanian stock market index

Bucharest Exchange Trading Total Return Index
- Historical logarithmic graph of the BET-TR from 2012 to 2026
- Foundation: 22 September 2014; 11 years ago
- Operator: Bucharest Stock Exchange
- Trading symbol: BET-TR
- Constituents: 20
- Type: Large-cap
- Market cap: US$28.04 billion (2026)
- Weighting method: Free-float capitalization-weighted
- Related indices: BET; BET-XT; ROTX; MSCI Romania
- Website: bvb.ro
- ISIN: ROXBSEI00070
- Reuters: .BETITR
- Bloomberg: BETTR

The Bucharest Exchange Trading Total Return Index (BET-TR) is a stock market index that tracks the performance of the most liquid stocks listed on the Bucharest Stock Exchange (BVB). The composition of the BET-TR is identical to that of the BET index. Unlike the price return BET index, which only reflects price movements, the BET-TR is a total return index, meaning it accounts for both price fluctuations and the reinvestment of dividends paid by its constituent companies.

The index is calculated in Romanian leu (RON), euro (EUR), and U.S. dollars (USD). The calculation formula factors in the reinvestment of net dividends on the ex-dividend date. To ensure diversification, the weight of any single company within the index is capped, usually at 20%.

Since its inception, the BET-TR has significantly outperformed the price return BET index due to the consistent dividend policy of large Romanian state-owned and private enterprises. It is often used as a benchmark for investment funds and exchange-traded funds (ETFs) targeting the Romanian market. In 2026, Banca Transilvania, listed the BT Index Romania ETF BET-TR on the Bucharest Stock Exchange designed to track the performance of the BET-TR index.

== History ==
The BET-TR was launched by the Bucharest Stock Exchange on 22 September 2014. It was the first total return index in the history of the Romanian capital market. Its purpose was to provide a more accurate representation of the actual gains realized by long-term investors, as the Romanian market is characterized by high dividend yields compared to regional peers.

The index was launched with a base value of 4,910.39 points, equal to the closing value of BET index on the base date. BET-TR is calculated retroactively starting with 24 September 2012.

== Composition ==
As of 17 April 2026, the Bucharest Exchange Trading Total Return Index consists of the following 20 companies, with a weighting as shown:

Company	Symbol	Sector (GICS)	Market Cap	Listed since	Index weighting
Banca Transilvania	BVB: TLV	Financials	US$9.6 billion	15 October 1997	21.02%
OMV Petrom	BVB: SNP	Energy	US$14.55 billion	03 September 2001	15.47%
Romgaz	BVB: SNG	Energy	US$11.09 billion	12 November 2013	12.11%
Hidroelectrica	BVB: H2O	Energy	US$16.64 billion	12 July 2023	11.80%
Transgaz	BVB: TGN	Energy	US$4.06 billion	24 January 2008	7.01%
BRD – Groupe Société Générale	BVB: BRD	Financials	US$4.84 billion	15 January 2001	6.82%
Digi Communications	BVB: DIGI	Communication Services	US$3.30 billion	16 May 2017	4.65%
Electrica	BVB: EL	Utilities	US$2.36 billion	04 July 2014	4.19%
MedLife	BVB: M	Health Care	US$1.53 billion	21 December 2016	3.81%
Nuclearelectrica	BVB: SNN	Energy	US$5.23 billion	4 November 2013	3.64%
Transelectrica	BVB: TEL	Energy	US$1.61 billion	29 August 2006	2.28%
Premier Energy	BVB: PE	Utilities	US$1.27 billion	28 May 2024	1.39%
Fondul Proprietatea	BVB: FP	Financials	US$740.2 million	25 January 2011	1.22%
One United Properties	BVB: ONE	Real Estate	US$794.7 million	12 July 2021	1.13%
Aquila Part Prod Com	BVB: AQ	Consumer Staples	US$431.7 million	29 November 2021	0.77%
Teraplast	BVB: TRP	Industrials	US$348.6 million	2 July 2008	0.62%
Transport Trade Services	BVB: TTS	Industrials	US$348.6 million	14 June 2021	0.59%
Antibiotice	BVB: ATB	Health Care	US$282.6 million	16 April 1997	0.50%
Sphera Franchise Group	BVB: SFG	Consumer Discretionary	US$351.6 million	9 November 2017	0.50%
Cris-Tim	BVB: CFH	Consumer Staples	US$459.6 million	26 November 2025	0.49%

== See also ==
- BET
- BET-XT
- ROTX
- Economy of Romania
- Foreign trade of Romania
- List of companies of Romania
- List of stock exchanges
- List of stock market indices
