= BET-XT =

Romanian stock market index

Bucharest Exchange Trading Extended Index
- Historical logarithmic graph of the BET-XT from 2011 to 2026
- Foundation: 1 July 2008; 18 years ago
- Operator: Bucharest Stock Exchange
- Trading symbol: BET-XT
- Constituents: 30
- Type: Large-cap
- Market cap: US$29.10 billion
- Weighting method: Free-float capitalization-weighted
- Related indices: BET; BET-TR; ROTX; MSCI Romania
- Website: bvb.ro
- ISIN: ROXBSEI00039
- Reuters: .BETIXT
- Bloomberg: BETXT

The Bucharest Exchange Trading Extended Index (BET-XT) is a stock market index consisting of the 30 most liquid stocks traded on the Bucharest Stock Exchange (BVB). The index serves as an extended version of the BET, providing broader exposure to the Romanian capital market by including a larger number of constituents and allowing for the inclusion of financial investment companies.

The BET-XT is designed to serve as an underlying asset for derivative instruments, including futures and options, as well as structured products like warrants, exchange-traded notes (ETNs) and swaps. It is calculated and disseminated in real-time by the Bucharest Stock Exchange in Romanian leu (RON), with end-of-day values also published in euro (EUR) and U.S. dollars (USD) to facilitate analysis and benchmarking for international investors.

== History ==
The BET-XT was officially launched on 1 July 2008. The index base value was set at 1,000 points, computed retroactively to 2 January 2007. Its creation was part of Bucharest Stock Exchange efforts to expand its index family and provide investors with a more comprehensive benchmark that included the financial investment companies, which were notably excluded from the flagship BET index.

Since its launch, the composition of the BET-XT has been reviewed quarterly (in March, June, September and December) by the BVB Index Committee to ensure it continues to represent the most liquid stocks on the exchange. The committee has made numerous changes over the years, including notable listings such as Romgaz and Nuclearelectrica in 2013, Digi Communications in 2017, and Hidroelectrica in 2023.

== Composition ==
As of 17 April 2026, the Bucharest Exchange Trading Extended Index consists of the following 30 companies, with a weighting as shown:

Company	Symbol	Sector (GICS)	Market Cap	Listed since	Index weighting
Banca Transilvania	BVB: TLV	Financials	US$9.6 billion	15 October 1997	15.80%
OMV Petrom	BVB: SNP	Energy	US$14.55 billion	3 September 2001	14.12%
Romgaz	BVB: SNG	Energy	US$11.09 billion	12 November 2013	11.65%
Hidroelectrica	BVB: H2O	Energy	US$16.64 billion	12 July 2023	11.35%
Transgaz	BVB: TGN	Energy	US$4.06 billion	24 January 2008	6.74%
BRD – Groupe Société Générale	BVB: BRD	Financials	US$4.84 billion	15 January 2001	6.56%
Digi Communications	BVB: DIGI	Communication Services	US$3.30 billion	16 May 2017	4.47%
Electrica	BVB: EL	Utilities	US$2.36 billion	4 July 2014	3.67%
MedLife	BVB: M	Health Care	US$1.53 billion	21 December 2016	3.50%
Nuclearelectrica	BVB: SNN	Utilities	US$5.23 billion	4 November 2013	2.25%
Evergent Investments	BVB: EVER	Financials	US$654.18 million	4 November 2013	2.19%
Transelectrica	BVB: TEL	Energy	US$1.61 billion	29 August 2006	1.93%
Lion Capital	BVB: LION	Financials	US$561.37 million	1 November 1999	1.34%
Premier Energy	BVB: PE	Utilities	US$1.27 billion	28 May 2024	1.31%
Infinity Capital Investments	BVB: INFINITY	Financials	US$380.96 million	1 November 1999	1.25%
Longshield Investment Group	BVB: LONG	Financials	US$364.60 million	1 November 1999	1.17%
Fondul Proprietatea	BVB: FP	Financials	US$740.2 million	25 January 2011	1.17%
One United Properties	BVB: ONE	Real Estate	US$794.7 million	12 July 2021	1.09%
Transilvania Investments Alliance	BVB: TRANSI	Financials	US$309.36 million	1 November 1999	1.06%
Aquila Part Prod Com	BVB: AQ	Consumer Staples	US$431.7 million	29 November 2021	0.74%
Teraplast	BVB: TRP	Industrials	US$348.6 million	2 July 2008	0.60%
Transport Trade Services	BVB: TTS	Industrials	US$348.6 million	14 June 2021	0.57%
Antibiotice	BVB: ATB	Health Care	US$282.6 million	16 April 1997	0.48%
Sphera Franchise Group	BVB: SFG	Consumer Discretionary	US$351.6 million	9 November 2017	0.48%
Cris-Tim	BVB: CFH	Consumer Staples	US$459.6 million	26 November 2025	0.47%
Bucharest Stock Exchange	BVB: BVB	Financials	US$106.35 million	08 June 2010	0.34%
Arobs Transilvania Software	BVB: AROBS	Information Technology	US$168.05 million	6 December 2021	0.29%
Conpet	BVB: COTE	Energy	US$163.94 million	4 August 2004	0.28%
Purcari Wineries	BVB: WINE	Consumer Staples	US$182.42 million	15 February 2018	0.13%
Impact Developer & Contractor	BVB: IMP	Real Estate	US$118.24 million	7 June 1996	0.12%

== See also ==
- BET
- BET-TR
- ROTX
- Economy of Romania
- Foreign trade of Romania
- List of companies of Romania
- List of stock exchanges
- List of stock market indices
