= BET Index =

Romanian stock market index

Bucharest Exchange Trading Index
- Historical logarithmic graph of the BET from 2000 to 2026
- Foundation: 19 September 1997; 28 years ago
- Operator: Bucharest Stock Exchange
- Trading symbol: BET
- Constituents: 20
- Type: Large-cap
- Market cap: US$28.13 billion (2026)
- Weighting method: Free-float capitalization-weighted
- Related indices: BET-TR; BET-XT; ROTX; MSCI Romania
- Website: bvb.ro
- ISIN: ROXBSEI00005
- Reuters: .BETI
- Bloomberg: BET

The Bucharest Exchange Trading Index (BET) is a stock market index that tracks the performance of the most liquid stocks listed on the Bucharest Stock Exchange (BVB). It is the first and primary benchmark for the Romanian capital market. The index is designed to serve as a performance and transparency benchmark and can be used as an underlying asset for derivatives and structured products.

The BET index crossed the 20,000-point threshold for the first time in 2025, eventually closing the year at a historic high of 24,439, marking its strongest annual growth rate since 2009. The total return index version, BET-TR, has performed even more strongly. Over the decade ending in 2025, the BET-TR index compounded significantly, placing it among the top best-performing global equity indices, alongside the Nasdaq-100 and S&P 500.

== History ==
The BET index was introduced on 19 September 1997, two years after the re-establishment of the Bucharest Stock Exchange, with an initial value of 1,000 points. It started with ten companies and a total market capitalization of 443 million Romanian lei (RON). Over time, the number of constituents has varied between a minimum of 10 and a maximum of 20 companies, based on liquidity and quality criteria.

In 2015, the index methodology was enhanced to include qualitative criteria related to transparency, reporting quality and investor communication, in addition to the quantitative liquidity metrics. Since its launch, 36 different issuers have been part of the BET index at various points in time.

== Methodology ==
The BET index is a free-float capitalization-weighted price index, calculated in real time during Bucharest Stock Exchange trading hours in Romanian leu (RON). Euro and U.S. dollars versions are published daily after the market close using exchange rates from the National Bank of Romania.

Each constituent weight is determined by two factors, the free-float factor and a representation factor that caps any single company weight at 20% of the total index capitalisation to ensure diversification. Unlike the BET-TR, the index is not adjusted for dividends, but operational adjustments are made for corporate events such as stock splits, consolidations, and capital increases to maintain continuity and avoid artificial price distortions.

== Composition ==
As of 19 April 2026, the Bucharest Exchange Trading Index consists of the following 20 companies, with a weighting as shown:

Company	Symbol	Sector (GICS)	Market Cap	Listed since	Index weighting
Banca Transilvania	BVB: TLV	Financials	US$9.6 billion	15 October 1997	21.02%
OMV Petrom	BVB: SNP	Energy	US$14.55 billion	3 September 2001	15.47%
Romgaz	BVB: SNG	Energy	US$11.09 billion	12 November 2013	12.11%
Hidroelectrica	BVB: H2O	Energy	US$16.64 billion	12 July 2023	11.80%
Transgaz	BVB: TGN	Energy	US$4.06 billion	24 January 2008	7.01%
BRD – Groupe Société Générale	BVB: BRD	Financials	US$4.84 billion	15 January 2001	6.82%
Digi Communications	BVB: DIGI	Communication Services	US$3.30 billion	16 May 2017	4.65%
Electrica	BVB: EL	Utilities	US$2.36 billion	4 July 2014	4.19%
MedLife	BVB: M	Health Care	US$1.53 billion	21 December 2016	3.81%
Nuclearelectrica	BVB: SNN	Energy	US$5.23 billion	4 November 2013	3.64%
Transelectrica	BVB: TEL	Energy	US$1.61 billion	29 August 2006	2.28%
Premier Energy	BVB: PE	Utilities	US$1.27 billion	28 May 2024	1.39%
Fondul Proprietatea	BVB: FP	Financials	US$740.2 million	25 January 2011	1.22%
One United Properties	BVB: ONE	Real Estate	US$794.7 million	12 July 2021	1.13%
Aquila Part Prod Com	BVB: AQ	Consumer Staples	US$431.7 million	29 November 2021	0.77%
Teraplast	BVB: TRP	Industrials	US$348.6 million	2 July 2008	0.62%
Transport Trade Services	BVB: TTS	Industrials	US$348.6 million	14 June 2021	0.59%
Antibiotice	BVB: ATB	Health Care	US$282.6 million	16 April 1997	0.50%
Sphera Franchise Group	BVB: SFG	Consumer Discretionary	US$351.6 million	9 November 2017	0.50%
Cris-Tim	BVB: CFH	Consumer Staples	US$459.6 million	26 November 2025	0.49%

== See also ==
- BET-TR
- BET-XT
- ROTX
- Bucharest Stock Exchange
- Economy of Romania
- Foreign trade of Romania
- List of companies of Romania
- List of stock exchanges
- List of stock market indices
