= ROTX =

Romanian stock market index

Romanian Traded Index
- Historical logarithmic graph of the ROTX from 2005 to 2026
- Foundation: 15 March 2005; 21 years ago
- Operator: Bucharest Stock Exchange; Wiener Börse
- Trading symbol: ROX (Note: Also traded as ROE for euros and ROL for Romanian lei.)
- Constituents: 14
- Type: Large-cap
- Market cap: US$30.4 billion (2026)
- Weighting method: Free-float capitalization-weighted
- Related indices: BET; BET-TR; BET-XT; MSCI Romania
- Website: www.wienerborse.at
- ISIN: AT0000600481 (Note: Also tracked as AT0000600473 for euros and AT0000600465 for Romanian lei.)
- Reuters: .ROTXUSD (Note: Also tracked as .ROTXEUR for euros and .ROTX for Romanian lei.)
- Bloomberg: ROTXUSD (Note: Also tracked as ROTXEUR for euros and ROTXL for Romanian lei.)

The Romanian Traded Index (ROTX) is a stock market index that tracks the performance of the most liquid and actively traded stocks listed on the Bucharest Stock Exchange (BVB). The index was developed by the Bucharest Stock Exchange in collaboration with the Wiener Börse, which calculates and disseminates it in real time.

Unlike the BET Index, the local benchmark of the Romanian capital market, ROTX is designed as a tradable index licensed as an underlying asset on international markets for foreign investors. It serves as the basis for a range of financial derivatives, including futures contracts and options, as well as structured products such as warrants, index certificates, swaps, exchange-traded funds (ETFs), and exchange-traded notes (ETNs).

Because the Wiener Börse disseminates it in major global currencies, such as the euro and the U.S. dollar, ROTX reduces foreign exchange risk for institutional investors. Several investment funds, such as BT Index Romania ROTX, also allow investors diversified exposure to the blue chip stocks of the Romanian capital market.

== History ==
The cooperation between the Bucharest Stock Exchange (BVB) and Wiener Börse was formalised through a memorandum of understanding signed in December 2004. The agreement laid the foundation for a long‑term partnership aimed at developing modern and efficient capital markets in both countries, with the joint development of a Romanian index as its first project.

The ROTX was officially launched on 15 March 2005, with a base value of 1,000 points set retroactively to 1 January 2002. The partnership aimed to increase the visibility of the Romanian capital market among foreign institutional investors by leveraging the technical infrastructure and calculation standards of the CECE Index Family, the Wiener Börse regional index focusing on Central and Eastern Europe. Initially, the index comprised six companies, covering about 80% of the trading volume and 85% of the market capitalization of the Bucharest Stock Exchange.

In 2007, Wiener Börse and BVB extended their co‑operation to include joint real-time data dissemination, further raising the international profile of both exchanges. The index composition has been adjusted regularly to reflect changes in the Romanian market, including the addition of newly listed companies such as Digi Communications (2017) and Hidroelectrica (2023).

On 24 April 2020, Wiener Börse introduced the ROTX Total Return (ROTX TR) and the ROTX Net Total Return (ROTX NTR), both free‑float weighted total return indices that include dividend payments. While the ROTX TR reflects gross dividend reinvestment, the ROTX NTR accounts for net dividend payments (after withholding taxes), thus reflecting the net total return of the underlying portfolio. Both indices are calculated in euros and Romanian lei and can be used as underlying assets for structured products and standardised derivatives. The launch was a response to the demand from international market participants for products that reflect the attractive dividend yields of the Romanian growth market.

== Index methodology ==
ROTX is a price index, which means that it does not include dividends paid by its constituent companies in the calculation of its value, unlike the total return variants published on 24 April 2020.

The index is a free‑float capitalization-weighted index. Weights are determined by the free float of each component and are capped at 20% per company to ensure diversification and compliance with UCITS standards.

The index composition is reviewed semi‑annually in March and September. Calculation parameters, such as free-float factors and caps, are updated quarterly by the CEE & CIS Index Committee of Wiener Börse.

The index is calculated and disseminated in real time by the Wiener Börse in euro, U.S. dollars and Romanian lei, and has been adopted by international data vendors such as Bloomberg L.P. and Reuters.

== Composition ==
As of 2026, the Romanian Traded Index consists of the following 14 companies:

Company	Symbol	Sector (GICS)	Market Cap	Listed since
Banca Transilvania	BVB: TLV	Financials	US$9.6 billion	15 October 1997
OMV Petrom	BVB: SNP	Energy	US$14.55 billion	3 September 2001
Hidroelectrica	BVB: H2O	Utilities	US$16.64 billion	12 July 2023
Romgaz	BVB: SNG	Energy	US$11.09 billion	12 November 2013
Transgaz	BVB: TGN	Energy	US$4.06 billion	24 January 2008
BRD – Groupe Société Générale	BVB: BRD	Financials	US$4.84 billion	15 January 2001
Digi Communications	BVB: DIGI	Communication Services	US$3.30 billion	16 May 2017
Electrica	BVB: EL	Utilities	US$2.36 billion	4 July 2014
MedLife	BVB: M	Health Care	US$1.53 billion	21 December 2016
Nuclearelectrica	BVB: SNN	Utilities	US$5.23 billion	4 November 2013
Transelectrica	BVB: TEL	Utilities	US$1.61 billion	29 August 2006
Premier Energy	BVB: PE	Utilities	US$1.27 billion	28 May 2024
Fondul Proprietatea	BVB: FP	Financials	US$740.2 million	25 January 2011
One United Properties	BVB: ONE	Real Estate	US$794.7 million	12 July 2021

== See also ==
- BET-TR
- BET-XT
- List of Romanian companies
- List of stock exchanges
- List of stock market indices
- Wiener Börse
