= Romanian capital market =

Since the Romanian Revolution of 1989, successive Romanian governments have tried to promote reform programs in all sectors: politics, economics, civil rights, local administration, etc. Among these measures has been the establishment of the modern Romanian capital market. The development of a Romanian capital market was founded on the privatisation program, in which shares in more than 5,000 companies, property of the Romanian State at the time, were granted for free to the population. These shares were listed on the RASDAQ market. On September 30, 2014 the Romanian Parliament decided that the RASDAQ market should be dissolved. The market still remains operational however it is no longer possible to list on it.

Currently, the Romanian capital market had two main components: the Bucharest Stock Exchange (BVB) and the Alternative Trading System (ATS), which is a part of BVB. There are 84 companies listed on BVB. Romania has also a separate derivatives exchange - The Sibiu Monetary Financial and Commodities Exchange (BMFMS). The Romanian market is regulated by the Romanian Financial Supervisory Authority (ASF).
