= Windows MultiPoint Mouse =

Windows MultiPoint Mouse is a technology that enables the use of multiple pointing devices on the same computer. This technology is particularly useful in schools, where a small group of students can use the same computer simultaneously. It was developed for the needs of developing countries where there may only be a limited number of computers available. The technology was conceived in the summer of 2005 and it was launched in December 2006.

Microsoft has made available a Windows MultiPoint Mouse SDK for applications. Today, various education ISVs and publishers around the world such as Scholastic and SIVECO Romania are developing and piloting applications built using the SDK.

Windows MultiPoint Mouse shares the common "MultiPoint" brand with Windows MultiPoint Server as both products aim to enable multiple individuals to work from a single computer, simultaneously. However, the technologies do not ship in a single distribution and are made separately available.
