= Sibiu Stock Exchange =

Stock exchange in Sibiu, Romania, later merged with Bucharest Stock Exchange

Sibex S.A.
- Sibex - Sibiu Stock Exchange
- Type: Commodities exchange, Futures exchange
- Location: Sibiu, Romania
- Founded: December 14, 1994
- Closed: 2017 merged with Bucharest Stock Exchange
- Key people: Ovidiu Petru, CEO
- Currency: RON
- Website: www.sibex.ro

The Sibex-Sibiu Stock Exchange (Sibex S.A. in Romanian) was a stock exchange and futures exchange in Romania that was the largest market for Futures and Options trading in Romania. It was established in 1994 and finally merged with the Bucharest Stock Exchange in 2017.

== History ==
=== Establishment 1994 ===
The Sibex-Sibiu Stock Exchange was established as a private company in December 1994, with 33.24 million lei share capital, and was the first Romanian exchange authorized by Romanian National Securities Commission (RNSC). Being the pioneer of exchange listed derivatives in Romania, Sibex is the leader in this market segment. In July 1997, Sibex (known at that time as Sibiu Monetary Financial and Commodities Exchange) has become Romania's first derivatives exchange through the implementation of futures contracts.

Since 1994, Sibex’s national and international recognition has grown significantly as the developments of the company have contributed to growth and consolidation of its position within the Romanian and international capital markets.

In 2005, Sibex was evaluated by PricewaterhouseCoopers to 3.4 million EUR, but it has been subject to continuous growth and expansion ever since. In comparison, in the same time period, PwC has evaluated the Bucharest Stock Exchange at 16 million EUR. As of May 2006, Sibex had 74 shareholders of which 38 were financial investment companies. Sibex is run by a Board of Directors presided by Mr. Ovidiu Petru, CEO and General Manager.

=== First failed merger proposal 2006 ===
In May 2006, Sibex discussed a merger with the larger Bucharest Stock Exchange, located in the capital of Romania. After a lengthy period of negotiations between sides, in October 2006, shareholders of the Bucharest Stock Exchange rejected the proposal.

Failing to absorb the Sibiu Exchange, Bucharest Stock Exchange (BVB) announced in June 2007 that it planned to open its own derivatives market in the near future. BVB has long announced plans to start its own derivative products based on its main composite indices: BET, BET-C, and BET-FI, (there is also a ROTX index, listed on the Vienna Stock Exchange). Eventually they might adopt currencies, stock index, and bonds as future underlying assets for their planned derivatives. Until then, The Sibex - Sibiu Stock Exchange will still be seen as Romania's one and only powerful derivative marketplace.

=== Growth 2007-2014 ===
In January 2008, Sibiu Exchange became a member of the Association of Futures Markets International organization which gathers stock exchanges and other financial entities in Europe, Asia, South America and Africa.

January 2010, Sibiu Monetary Financial and Commodities Exchange (SMFCE) had officially launched the regulated spot market and its shares were admitted to trading on the regulated market administered by SMFCE.

March, 2011, Sibiu Exchange changed its name into Sibex - Sibiu Stock Exchange (Sibex). Also the new logo of the company was launched, representing 7 Transylvanian cities, signifying the meeting place for the investors who choose to turn their ideas into money. The new logo represents the local tradition of exchange and seriousness.

In 2013, Sibex signs the partnership agreement with OPCOM (Romanian Gas and Electricity Market Operator) for the development and launching of the power derivatives on Sibex financial derivatives regulated market. Sibex started to trade futures contract on US stocks, for the first time in Romania.

In February 2014, Sibex signed the partnership agreement with ATHEX Group incorporating: the provision of clearing services from ATHEXClear under EMIR requirements, use of ATHEX Group multi-exchange trading platform (OASIS) by SIBEX along with ATHEX and Cyprus Stock Exchange, use of XNET services, thus offering access to global markets.

In December 2014, Sibex finalizes the project regarding the connection of the derivatives market to a Central Counterparty- ATHEXClear, as well as the migration of the derivatives market to a new trading system. This project is by far, the most important project related to the infrastructure of SIBEX-Sibiu Stock Exchange. Sibex activity is managed by a Board of Directors whose Chairman is Mr. Galatanu Ovidiu Dan. The executive management is run by Mr. Petru Ovidiu as Chief Executive Officer.

=== Merger with Bucharest Stock Exchange ===
In 2017, Bucharest Stock Exchange (BVB) merged with Sibex, concluding with the dissolution of the latter.

== Products ==
As opposed to Bucharest Stock Exchange, Romania's largest stock market, SIBEX focuses on the derivative financial products. Sibex-Sibiu Stock Exchange was Romania's first and largest market of Futures and Options contracts as a market/system operator it administered the regulated derivatives market, regulated spot market and alternative trading system. On the derivatives market, Sibex was trading products with underlying Single Stock Futures, Futures Index, Commodities Futures and Currency futures.

The shares traded on the regulated spot market and on the alternative trading system of Sibex – Sibiu Stock Exchange were settled through Sibex Depository’s system.

Clearing and settlement of trades with financial derivatives on the regulated market administered by Sibex – Sibiu Stock Exchange was accomplished by Athens Exchange Clearing House, which is a Central Counterparty defined in accordance with applicable European regulations and authorized by its national authority, contractually designated by SIBEX as provider of clearing and settlement of financial derivatives trades for one or more regulated markets managed by SIBEX.
