= MSCI Romania =

Romanian stock market index

- Historical logarithmic graph of the MSCI Romania Index from 2005 to 2026
- Foundation: 18 December 2007; 18 years ago
- Operator: MSCI
- Exchanges: Bucharest Stock Exchange
- Constituents: 14
- Type: Large and mid cap
- Market cap: US$26.76 billion
- Weighting method: Free-float capitalization-weighted
- Related indices: MSCI World; MSCI EAFE
- Website: www.msci.com

The MSCI Romania Index is a stock market index that tracks the performance of large and mid-capitalization segments of the Romanian equity market. Maintained by MSCI, one of the largest global index providers of benchmark indices, the index is designed to cover approximately 85% of the free float-adjusted market capitalization in Romania.

It serves as a key benchmark for international investors seeking exposure to Romanian publicly traded companies.

== Index methodology ==
The MSCI Romania Index is based on the MSCI Global Investable Market Indexes (GIMI) Methodology, a consistent approach to index construction that enables global comparisons across market capitalization size, sector, and style segments. The index is designed to measure the performance of the large and mid-cap segments of the Romanian equity market, covering approximately 85% of the Romanian stock market.

The index is a free‑float capitalization-weighted index. It is reviewed quarterly, in February, May, August, and November, with the objective of reflecting changes in the underlying stock markets in a timely manner while limiting undue index turnover.

== See also ==
- BET-TR
- BET-XT
- List of Romanian companies
- List of stock exchanges
- List of stock market indices
- MSCI
