= Bucharest Stock Exchange =

Romanian stock exchange

- Bursa de Valori București

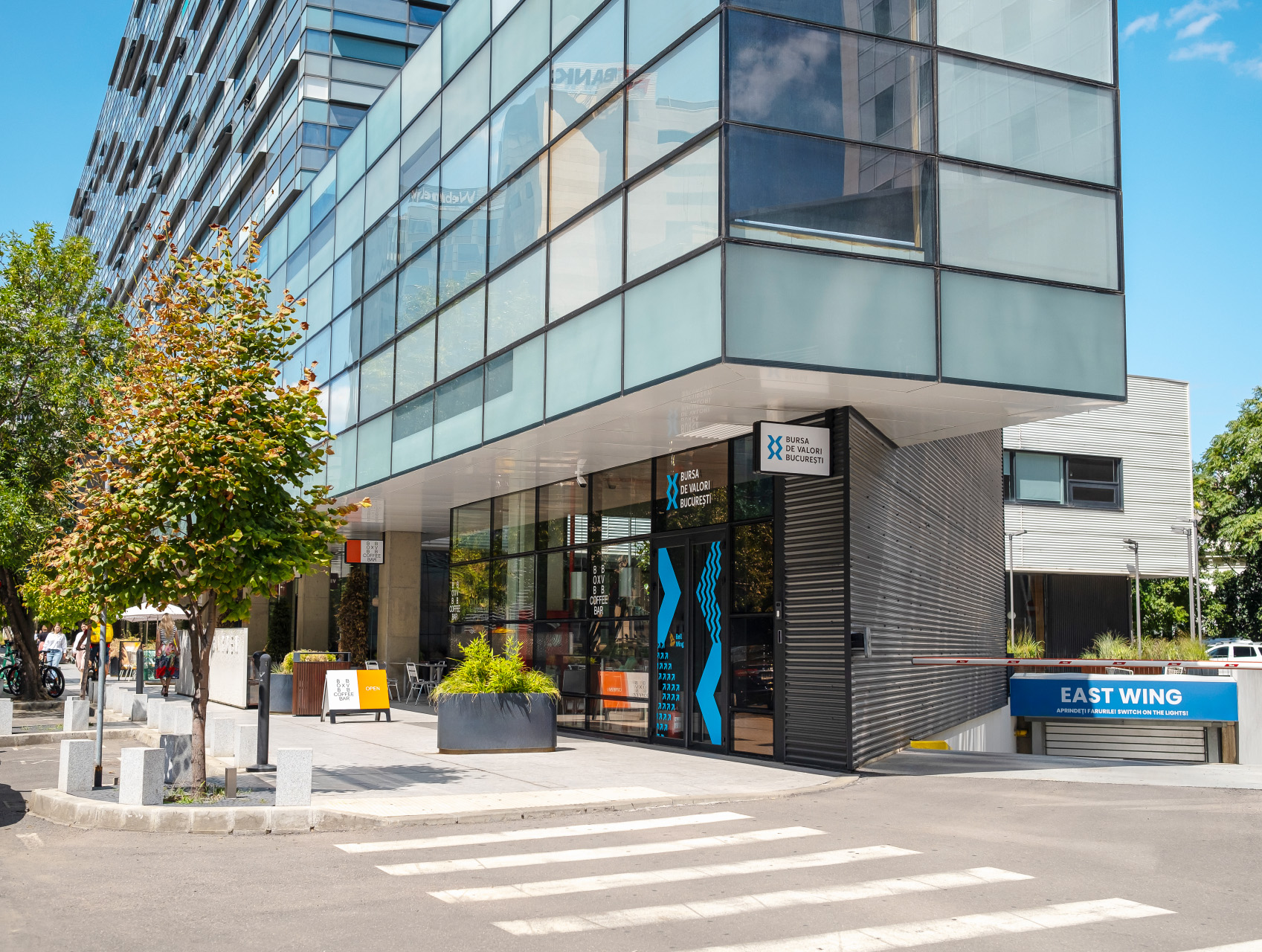
- BVB headquarters in Bucharest
- Type: Stock exchange
- Location: Bucharest, Romania
- Coordinates: 44°27′8″N 26°4′58″E
- Founded: 1 December 1882; 143 years ago; 21 April 1995; 31 years ago; reopened
- Owner: Institutional and private investors
- Key people: Radu Hanga (Chairman); Remus Vulpescu (CEO)
- Currency: Romanian leu (RON)
- No. of listings: 630 (2026)
- Market cap: US$163 billion (2026)
- Volume: 9.3 billion (2026)
- Indices: BET; BET-TR; BET-XT; ROTX; MSCI Romania
- Website: bvb.ro

The Bucharest Stock Exchange (Romanian: Bursa de Valori București, BVB) is a Romanian stock exchange headquartered in Bucharest. It is the largest in Southeastern Europe by market capitalization, facilitating the trading of stocks, bonds, investment funds, derivatives, and structured products.

Founded on 1 December 1882 by royal decree under King Carol I, the exchange initially operated as a stock exchange and commodity market, playing a central role in financing industrialization and agricultural trade in the Kingdom of Romania until its closure in 1948 by the communist regime. Following the fall of communism, it was re-established in April 1995 and held its first trading session on 20 November 1995, with only six companies listed. In 2005 it became a joint-stock company before listing its own shares on the regulated market in 2010.

== History ==
=== Early history ===
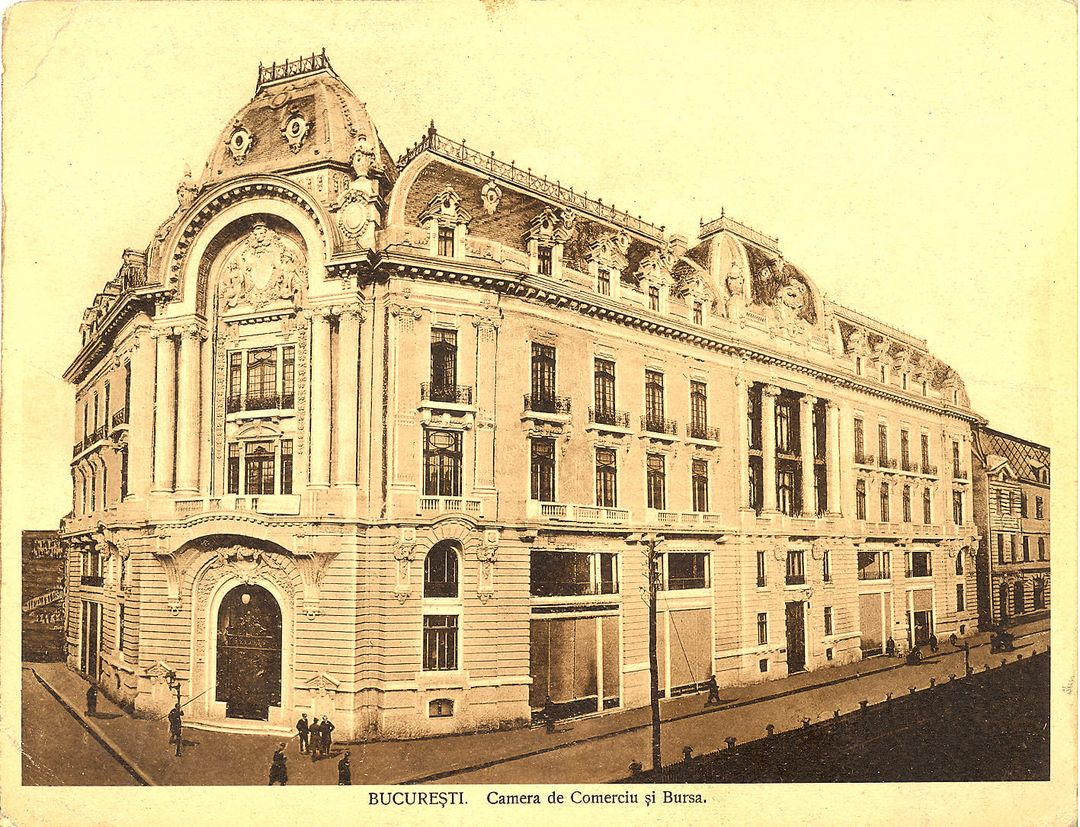
The Bucharest Stock Exchange Palace, 1912

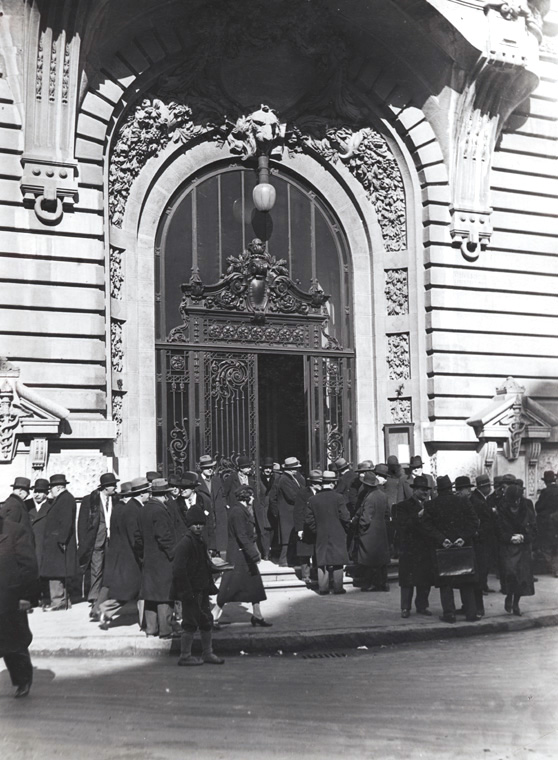
Romanian stockbrokers and traders gathering outside Stock Exchange Palace, 1928

The first stock exchange and commodity market in Romania began trading on 1 December 1882, following a royal decree issued by King Carol I. During the late 19th and early 20th centuries the exchange played a central role in financing industrialization and agricultural trade in the Kingdom of Romania. After the communist regime took hold after World War II, the exchange was closed in 1948 and all trading activities were suspended.

Following the fall of communism and the transition to a market economy, the Bucharest Stock Exchange was re‑established as a public‑interest institution in April 1995. The first trading session took place on 20 November 1995, when only six companies were listed. By the end of that year the number had grown to nine. In 1997 the exchange created its first stock market index, BET, and started listing the first large state-owned enterprises as part of the mass‑privatization program.

=== Corporatization and market development ===
In 2005 the BVB was demutualized and became a joint-stock company. The same year it merged with the Rasdaq electronic exchange, absorbing the over-the-counter market for smaller companies and the legacy securities of former mass‑privatization schemes.

By 2010 the BVB itself became a publicly traded company, offering its shares on the regulated market. As such, it has a broad shareholder base dominated by Romanian institutional investors at 76.9% of capital and Romanian private investors at 20.6%. While investment funds, pension funds, banks, and brokers hold the largest individual stakes, Romanian law caps any single shareholder's voting rights at 20%.

In 2015 the exchange launched AeRO, a multilateral trading facility (MTF) designed to provide a lighter regulatory framework for start‑ups and small and medium-sized enterprises (SMEs) not yet ready for the main market.

The consolidation of the Romanian capital market was finalized between 2006 and 2017 through several attempts were made to merge the BVB with the Sibiu Stock Exchange (SIBEX). The Bucharest Tribunal finally approved the merger in December 2017, with absorption taking effect on 1 January 2018. From that date Romania has a single stock exchange.

=== Recent developments ===
Global recognition followed in September 2019 when FTSE Russell upgraded Romania from Frontier market to Secondary Emerging market status, recognising the improved market liquidity, transparency and regulatory framework of the BVB. The reclassification took effect in September 2020, allowing Romania to be included in the FTSE Global Equity Index Series (GEIS). A further upgrade came in June 2025, when MSCI reclassified Romania to its new Advanced Frontier Market category.

In August 2023, the exchange incorporated EuroCTP as a joint venture with 13 other European bourses, with the aim of tendering to become the consolidated tape provider for equities and exchange-traded funds (ETFs) in the European Union, in furtherance of the Capital Markets Union initiative advanced under the MiFID II framework.

Most recently, in December 2024 the BVB, with support from the European Bank for Reconstruction and Development (EBRD), published a revised corporate governance code aligned with OECD and European Union (EU) standards, applicable to all companies listed on the main market from the fiscal year 2025. In August 2026, Interactive Brokers, one of the largest electronic trading platforms, began offering trading access to shares and exchange-traded funds (ETFs) listed on the Bucharest Stock Exchange, extending international investors access to Romanian stock market.

== Operations ==
The Bucharest Stock Exchange (BVB) operates two main market segments. The regulated market is the primary venue for established joint-stock companies, subject to full European Union prospectus, transparency, and market abuse regulations. The AeRO, a multilateral trading facility (MTF) launched in 2015, serves start-ups, high‑growth companies and small and medium-sized enterprises (SMEs) with relaxed admission requirements.

The exchange also lists corporate, municipal and government bonds, investment funds, derivatives, and structured products. All trading is electronic via the ARENA platform, with hours Monday to Friday 9:45-18:00 UTC+2 (EET). Settlement follows a T+2 cycle. The exchange moved from T+3 to T+2 on 6 October 2014, and European Securities and Markets Authority (ESMA) recommended the EU transition to T+1 on 11 October 2027.

Clearing and settlement are provided by Depozitarul Central, the central securities depository (CSD) linked to the Eurosystem TARGET2-Securities (T2S) platform and the sole issuer of ISIN and CFI codes in Romania. A dedicated central counterparty (CCP), CCP.RO Bucharest S.A., was established on 4 November 2019 and was authorized on 1 July 2026.

Listing on the regulated market requires joint-stock company status, equity or market capitalization of at least €1 million, and a free float of at least 25%. Additionally, companies must have at least three years of market activity and a prospectus approved by the Romanian Financial Supervisory Authority (ASF). For AeRO, requirements are lighter, including a minimum market capitalization of €250,000 and a free‑float of at least 10% or at least 30 shareholders, a presentation document, and an authorised consultant. Companies may list via a capital increase, sale of an existing block, or a technical listing without a public offering.

== Indices ==
The Bucharest Stock Exchange (BVB) calculates and reports 12 stock market indices and two international indices, the ROTX, and the MSCI Romania. All indices are free-float capitalization-weighted price indices with specific capping limits for individual components. While most indices track price movements, the total return and net total return variants account for the reinvestment of dividends.

Index composition is reviewed every March, June, September, and December. All indices are calculated in Romanian lei, euro, and U.S. dollars and distributed in real time. Their methodology is designed to allow them to serve as underlying assets for derivatives and structured products.

The BET index is the first and principal benchmark index of the Bucharest Stock Exchange, tracking the most liquid companies on the regulated market excluding investment companies. Selection is based on liquidity, transparency, and communication quality, with individual weighting capped at 20%. The BET-XT is an extended version that tracks the 30 most liquid companies including investment companies, while the BET-BK serves as a benchmark index designed for asset managers and institutional investors.

The BETPlus tracks Romanian companies on the regulated market (excluding investment companies) that meet minimum liquidity and free-float market capitalization criteria. The ROTX is co-developed with the Wiener Börse and reflects the performance of Romanian blue chip stocks. Similarly, the MSCI Romania tracks the large and mid-cap stocks of the Romanian equity market.

Several indices offer total return variants. The BET-TR is the first total return version of the BET, reflecting both price movements and dividend distributions, while the BET-TRN represents the net total return version (reinvesting net dividends). Similarly, the BET-XT-TR and BET-XT-TRN provide total return and net total return versions of the BET-XT index, respectively.

Industrial and specialized indices include the BET-FI, the first industrial index tracking investment companies and similar entities such as Fondul Proprietatea. The BET-NG is a industrial index tracking companies in the energy industry and public utility, with individual weights capped at 30%. The BET-EF reflects representative Romanian companies in the energy, public utility, and financial services, with weights capped at 20%. The BETAeRO is the first index for the AeRO market, tracking representative companies based on liquidity and free-float capitalization, with individual weights capped at 15%.

== Trading hours ==
The Bucharest Stock Exchange (BVB) operates from Monday to Friday, with sessions typically running between 09:45 and 18:00 (EET/EEST). Trading is divided into several phases. A pre-open auction from 09:45 to 10:00, continuous trading for the regular market from 10:00 to 17:45, followed by a pre-close auction and a trading at last session that concludes at 18:00.

Specialized market segments, such as public offering and corporate action, generally operate between 10:00 and 14:30. The Bucharest Stock Exchange does not trade on Saturdays and Sundays, nor on public holidays in Romania and specific dates declared by the BVB in advance.

== See also ==
- BET
- BET-TR
- BET-XT
- ROTX
- MSCI Romania
- Economy of Romania
- List of stock exchanges
- Romanian Financial Supervisory Authority
