= Banca Transilvania =

Romanian bank and financial services group

Banca Transilvania S.A.

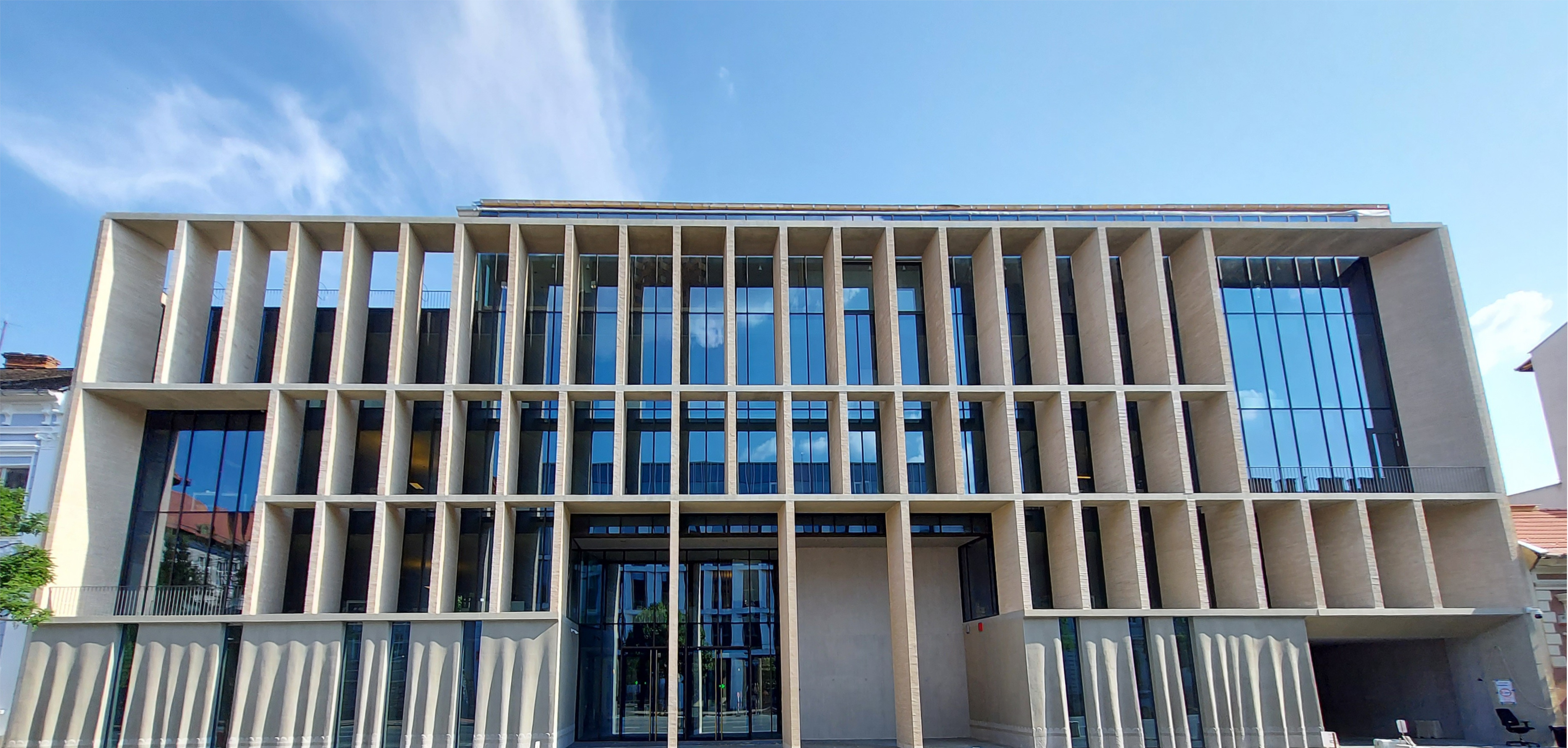
- Banca Transilvania's headquarters in Cluj-Napoca
- Trade name: BT
- Type: Public
- Traded as: BVB: TLV; BET component; ROTX component
- ISIN: ROTLVAACNOR1
- Industry: Financial services
- Founded: 16 February 1993; 33 years ago
- Headquarters: Calea Dorobanților 30–36, Cluj‑Napoca, Romania
- Number of locations: 500 branches (2026)
- Area served: Romania, Italy, Moldova
- Key people: Horia Ciorcilă (Chairman); Ömer Tetik (CEO)
- Products: Retail banking; Corporate banking; Mortgage loans; Credit cards; Investment banking; Wealth management; Insurance
- Revenue: ▲RON3.08 billion (2026)
- Net income: ▲RON1.14 billion (2026)
- Total assets: ▲RON226.97 billion (2026)
- Total equity: ▲RON23.16 billion (2026)
- Owner: 79.37% Romanian shareholders, 20.63% international (2025)
- Number of employees: 14,300 (2025)
- Subsidiaries: BT Capital Partners; BT Leasing; BT Asset Management; BT Direct; BT Leasing; BT Mic; BT Pensii; Salt Bank; Victoriabank; Inno Investments; Microinvest
- Rating: Fitch (2026): BBB; Outlook: Negative
- Website: www.bancatransilvania.ro

Banca Transilvania is a Romanian universal bank and financial services group. Founded on 16 February 1993 and headquartered in Cluj-Napoca with an initial capital of US$2 million raised by 46 local entrepreneurs, the institution has grown to become the largest bank in Romania and Southeastern Europe with a growing multinational footprint. As of 2026, the group held a c. 23% share of national banking assets, and it is designated as the most systemically important financial institution by the National Bank of Romania.

It provides a full range of retail, corporate and investment banking services including loans, bank deposits, leasing, and online banking. Banca Transilvania was the first Romanian bank to list on the Bucharest Stock Exchange and remains the oldest component of the BET Index. The bank has received international recognition, including being named "Romania's Best Private Bank" by Euromoney magazine in 2026. It is also recognised for its sustainable practices, having received a "Low Risk" ESG rating from Sustainalytics and a Gold Level recognition for its sustainability reporting.

== History ==
=== Founding and early years ===
Banca Transilvania was established on 16 February 1993 at the initiative of 46 Romanian entrepreneurs, most of them based in Cluj-Napoca. The founders contributed an initial share capital of US$2 million, and the bank officially began its operations on 16 February 1994 with a single branch in Cluj-Napoca and a team of 13 employees. Its first customers were the founders themselves, along with their families, friends, and neighbours.

It became the first Romanian bank to be listed on the Bucharest Stock Exchange, offering shares to the public and establishing a diversified shareholder base.

=== Development and market expansion ===
In 2001, Banca Transilvania began its nationwide expansion of the branch network, marking its first major reinvention. The bank adapted its business model following the 2008 financial crisis, focusing on operational efficiency and risk management. Over the following decade, it increased its customer base from approximately 15,000 clients in 1994 to over 4 million by 2024.

The bank has consistently reinvested almost all of its profits into business growth, paying dividends only twice (in 1998 and 2009) during its first 21 years of operation. This strategy allowed the bank to capitalise earnings and finance its expansion.

In 2021, Banca Transilvania became the first bank in Romania to receive ISO 9001:2015 quality certification for its card payment solutions, following an external audit conducted by SGS Romania. The certification attests the quality of the bank's POS and E-commerce services and solutions.

=== Acquisitions ===
Since 2015, Banca Transilvania has pursued an aggressive acquisition strategy to consolidate its market leadership. OTP Bank Romania was the fourth bank acquired by Banca Transilvania in approximately one decade, following Volksbank Romania (2015), Bancpost (2018), and Idea Bank (2022).

In December 2018, Banca Transilvania completed the merger with Bancpost, integrating the bank into its operations over nine months. The acquisition strengthened BT's position as the largest financier of the Romanian economy, with over 3 million customers and almost 30,000 shareholders at the time.

In 2024, Banca Transilvania acquired OTP Bank Romania and its subsidiaries from OTP Group for €347.5 million. The merger was completed on 28 February 2025, and integration was finalised in a record time of seven months, due to operational similarities and synergies between the two banks. Following the merger, BT's market share reached 23%, with a 9% increase in assets and a 13% rise in the loan portfolio.

In November 2025, the Romanian Financial Supervisory Authority approved the acquisition of BRD Pensii, the private pension fund administrator (Pillar II), by the BT Financial Group. This made BT the first majority Romanian capital administrator of a mandatory private pension fund (Pillar II) in Romania, with total managed assets of approximately RON 9.2 billion.

== Corporate affairs ==
=== Ownership and shareholders ===
Banca Transilvania is a publicly listed company with a dispersed ownership structure. As of 2025, the bank has nearly 71,000 shareholders, having doubled its number of shareholders since 2021. Approximately 27% of shareholders are individuals, while 73% are legal entities, including private pension funds and mutual funds. Romanian capital represents about 80% of the total shareholding, with the remaining 20% held by foreign investors.

The free float is approximately 86.86%, reflecting the bank's high market liquidity on the Bucharest Stock Exchange. Institutional investors hold about 21.1% of shares, while individuals hold approximately 5.02% directly. The bank has no majority controlling shareholder. The European Bank for Reconstruction and Development (EBRD) holds 5.16% of shares.

The bank is led by Ömer Tetik, who has been Chief Executive Officer for over a decade. Horia Ciorcilă, one of the original 46 founders, is Chairman of the Board of Directors.

=== Subsidiaries ===
Banca Transilvania is the core entity of the BT Financial Group, which includes several specialised subsidiaries such as BT Leasing, BT Asset Management, BT Direct, BT Mic, BT Pensii, Salt Bank, Inno Investments, and Microinvest. The group also controls Victoriabank in Moldova, which completed a merger with BCR Chișinău in 2025. BT Capital Partners, the group's brokerage firm and the largest broker on the Bucharest Stock Exchange (BVB), coordinates local and international capital market transactions.

Salt Bank, the group's fully digital bank, was launched in 2024. By 2026 it had exceeded 700,000 customers and reached total assets of RON 2 billion.

=== Financial results ===
For the 2025 financial year, the bank reported the following key figures on an individual (bank‑only) basis:

- Net profit: RON 4.10 billion (up 16% year‑on‑year).
- Total assets: RON 224.4 billion (up 8.4%).
- Return on equity (ROE): 25.23%.
- Capital adequacy ratio (CAR): reported above 23% (consistent with previous guidance).
- Net loans and leasing receivables: RON 106.7 billion (up 10.7%).
- Non-performing loan (NPL) ratio (EBA definition): 2.40%.

On a consolidated financial statement basis (including the full effect of the OTP Bank Romania acquisition), the BT Financial Group posted a net profit of RON 4.66 billion for 2025, with total assets reaching RON 224.4 billion and customer deposits of RON 167.8 billion.

In the first quarter of 2026, the group's net profit reached RON 1.14 billion (up 30.1% year‑on‑year), and total assets reached RON 227 billion. Banca Transilvania itself contributed 83% of the group's net profit.

=== Ratings ===
- Fitch Ratings: Long‑term issuer default rating upgraded to "BBB" with a negative outlook (May 2026), one notch above Romania's sovereign rating.
- Moody's Ratings: Long‑term deposit rating at "Baa1" with a negative outlook (as of 2025).
- Sustainalytics: ESG Risk rating of 15 ("Low Risk"), ranking the bank 127th out of nearly 1,000 banks worldwide (2026).

=== Bond issuance ===
In 2025, Banca Transilvania issued its first sustainable bond denominated in Romanian lei, raising RON 1.5 billion. The bonds were listed on the Bucharest Stock Exchange on 25 July 2025, carry an 8.87% annual coupon, and mature in 2032.

In April 2026, Banca Transilvania completed the largest bond issue in Central and Eastern Europe, raising €1 billion on international markets. The transaction was oversubscribed nearly four times, with the order book totalling €3.8 billion from over 200 institutional investors across 32 countries. The bond was the bank's first investment grade instrument, rated BBB‑ (stable outlook) by Fitch Ratings. The offering was coordinated by Goldman Sachs Bank Europe SE, JPMorgan Chase, Morgan Stanley, Nomura Holdings, and BT Capital Partners, achieving global distribution across Europe, the United Kingdom, the United States, and Asia. The coupon rate was reduced from an initial 5.125% to 4.75%, a reduction of over 30 basis points. The bonds mature in 2032 and are listed on Euronext Dublin.

Banca Transilvania has raised a total of €4 billion through bond issuances since 2023, reinforcing its access to international capital markets.

== Sponsorships ==
• 2021: it becomes the official jersey sponsor of the Romanian national basketball team, U-BT Cluj-Napoca and Romania national under-21 football team

• 2025: on 1 August during the Hungarian Grand Prix Banca Transilvania officially becomes one of the sponsors of McLaren-Mercedes Formula 1 Team

== See also ==
- List of banks in Romania
- Bucharest Stock Exchange
- Economy of Romania
