= List of companies of Romania =

Location of Romania

Romania is a sovereign state located in Southeastern Europe. Following rapid economic growth in the early 2000s, Romania has an economy predominantly based on services, and is a producer and net exporter of machines and electric energy, featuring companies like Automobile Dacia and OMV Petrom. It has been a member of NATO since 2004, and part of the European Union since 2007. A strong majority of the population identify themselves as Eastern Orthodox Christians and are native speakers of Romanian, a Romance language. The cultural history of Romania is often referred to when dealing with influential artists, musicians, inventors and sportspeople. For similar reasons, Romania has been the subject of notable tourist attractions.

For further information on the types of business entities in this country and their abbreviations, see "Business entities in Romania".

== Notable firms ==
This list includes notable companies with primary headquarters located in the country. The industry and sector follow the Industry Classification Benchmark taxonomy. Organizations which have ceased operations are included and noted as defunct.

Notable companies Status: P=Private, S=State; A=Active, D=Defunct
Name	Industry	Sector	Headquarters	Founded	Notes	Status	
Adevărul Holding	Consumer services	Publishing	Bucharest	2008	Magazines and newspapers	P	A
Angst	Consumer services	Food retailers & wholesalers	Buftea	1990	Supermarket chain	P	A
Antibiotice Iași	Health care	Pharmaceuticals	Iași	1955	Research and drug manufacturing	P	A
Apulum	Consumer goods	Durable household products	Alba Iulia	1970	Porcelain	P	A
Arctic S.A.	Consumer goods	Durable household products	Găești	1968	Appliances	P	A
Automobile Dacia	Consumer goods	Automobiles	Mioveni	1966	Car manufacturer	P	A
Banca Comercială Română (BCR)	Financials	Banks	Bucharest	1990	Bank and financial services, part of Erste Group (Austria)	P	A
Banca Transilvania	Financials	Banks	Cluj-Napoca	1993	Bank	P	A
Bitdefender	Technology	Software	Bucharest	2001	Cybersecurity	P	A
Blue Air	Consumer services	Airlines	Bucharest	2004	Airline	P	A
BRD – Groupe Société Générale	Financials	Banks	Bucharest	1923	Bank, majority owned by Société Générale (France)	P	A
Căile Ferate Române	Industrials	Railroads	Bucharest	1880	Railways	S	A
Continental Hotels	Consumer services	Hotels	Bucharest	1991	Hotel holdings	P	A
Dedeman	Consumer services	Retail services	Bacău	1992	Hypermarkets	P	A
Digi Communications	Telecommunications	Fixed line telecommunications	Bucharest	1993	Telecom	P	A
European Drinks & Foods	Consumer goods	Food products	Ștei	1993	Food producer	P	A
Farmec	Consumer goods	Personal products	Cluj-Napoca	1993	Cosmetics	P	A
GeCAD Software	Technology	Software	Bucharest	1992	CAD software	P	A
Grup Feroviar Român	Industrials	Railroads	Bucharest	2001	Railways and rolling stock	P	A
Intact Media Group	Consumer services	Media agencies	Bucharest	1991	Media	P	A
Jolidon	Consumer goods	Clothing & accessories	Cluj-Napoca	1993	Clothing and accessories	P	A
Mangalia shipyard	Industrials	Commercial vehicles & trucks	Mangalia	1997	Shipyard, part of Damen Group (Netherlands)	P	A
Mega Image	Consumer services	Food retailers & wholesalers	Bucharest	1995	Supermarkets, part of Delhaize Group (Belgium)	P	A
Metrorex	Consumer services	Travel & tourism	Bucharest	1976	Passenger metro	P	A
Mobexpert	Consumer services	Specialty retailers	Bucharest	1993	Furniture retailer	P	A
Napolact	Consumer goods	Food products	Cluj-Napoca	1905	Food processor, part of FrieslandCampina (Netherlands)	P	A
Orange Romania	Telecommunications	Mobile telecommunications	Bucharest	1997	Mobile network, founded as "Dialog"; part of Orange S.A. (France)	P	A
Petrom	Oil & gas	Integrated oil & gas	Bucharest	1991	Integrated oil and gas, part of OMV (Austria)	P	A
Poșta Română	Industrials	Delivery services	Bucharest	1862	Postal administration	S	A
Raiffeisen Romania	Financials	Banks	Bucharest	1998	Bank, part of Raiffeisen Bank International (Austria)	P	A
Realitatea-Cațavencu	Consumer services	Media agencies	Bucharest	2006	Print and broadcast	P	A
Regiotrans	Consumer services	Travel & tourism	Brașov	2005	Private passenger rail	P	A
Roman	Industrials	Commercial vehicles & trucks	Brașov	1921	Truck and bus manufacturer	P	A
Romgaz	Utilities	Oil & gas distribution	Mediaș	1909	Natural gas distribution & transportation	S	A
Rompetrol	Oil & gas	Exploration & production	Bucharest	1974	Part of KMG International	P	A
Romstal	Industrials	Industrial suppliers	Bucharest	1994	Sanitary supplies	P	A
Romtelecom	Telecommunications	Fixed line telecommunications	Bucharest	1989	Telecom, defunct 2014	P	D
SIVECO Romania	Technology	Software	Bucharest	1992	Business software	P	A
Softpedia	Technology	Software	Bucharest	2001	Information software	P	A
Softwin	Technology	Software	Bucharest	1990	Anti-virus software	P	A
TAROM	Consumer services	Airlines	Otopeni	1954	Flag carrier	P	A
Tehnoton	Consumer goods	Consumer electronics	Iaşi	1972	Home electronics	P	A
Telekom Romania	Telecommunications	Fixed line telecommunications & mobile telecommunications	Bucharest	1991	Founded as Romtelecom, part of Deutsche Telekom (Germany)	P	A
Terapia Ranbaxy	Health care	Pharmaceuticals	Cluj-Napoca	1920	Pharma	P	A
Țiriac Holdings	Conglomerates	-	Bucharest	1990	Financials, retail, real estate, media, construction	P	A
Transelectrica	Utilities	Electricity transmission	Bucharest	2000	Electric power transmission	S	A
Transferoviar Grup	Industrials	Railroads	Cluj-Napoca	2003	Railways	P	A
Trilulilu	Technology	Internet	Cluj-Napoca	2007	File sharing	P	A
UPC Romania	Telecommunications	Fixed line telecommunications	Bucharest	1992	Telecom, part of Liberty Global (US), UPC, defunct 2020	P	D
UTI Holdings	Conglomerates	-	Bucharest	1990	Technology, construction, defense	P	A
Vodafone Romania	Telecommunications	Mobile telecommunications	Bucharest	1997	Founded as Connex GSM, part of Vodafone (UK)	P	A

== See also ==
- List of banks in Romania
- List of supermarket chains in Romania
- List of privatizations in Romania
