= Tehnoton =

Romanian household appliances country

- Company type: Private
- Industry: Household appliances
- Founded: 1972
- Headquarters: Iași, Iași County, Romania
- Website: http://www.tehnoton.com/

Tehnoton (Romanian pronunciation: [tehnoˈton]) is a Romanian company founded in 1972 in Iaşi, mainly manufacturing home electronics and industrial machinery. By 1989 it became one of the major Romanian manufacturers of radio tuners (with widely known products such as "Gloria" and "Cosmos"), Compact Cassette players, and record players, which it also exported to France, Japan, and the United States. Tehnoton also produced closed-circuit television systems and maritime communication systems for Romania and other Eastern European countries.

The company was privatized in 2000 and is now the main part of the Omega-Tehnoton Group. Currently, it specializes in metal processing, plastic injection, and electronics production.
