= Market Abuse Directive =

EU legislation

The Market Abuse Directive (MAD) is a European Union (EU) legislation that aims to prevent and detect market abuse in the financial markets. It was enacted in 2003 and later revised in 2014, making it a key component of the EU's efforts to regulate and maintain fair and transparent financial markets. The MAD applies to all financial instruments listed on an EU regulated market, including stocks, bonds, derivatives, and commodities.

== History ==
Market abuse, which refers to activities that distort the market and harm its integrity, has been a growing concern for regulators and investors around the world. The lack of clear regulations and the rise of complex financial instruments have made market abuse more widespread and harder to detect. As a result, the EU introduced the MAD in 2003 to establish a uniform set of rules for financial markets within its member states. In 2014, the EU revised the MAD to strengthen its provisions and align it with the international standards set by the Committee of European Securities Regulators (CESR) and the International Organization of Securities Commissions (IOSCO). The revised MAD, also known as MAD II, became effective in July 2016.

== Objective ==
The main objective of the MAD is to increase market integrity, maintain investor confidence, and protect the overall stability of the financial system in the EU. It aims to achieve these goals by prohibiting and imposing sanctions on market abuse activities such as insider dealing, unlawful disclosure of insider information, and market manipulation. Insider dealing refers to the use of confidential information to gain unfair profits in the financial markets. The MAD prohibits any individual from using privileged information to make trades or encourage others to do so. Unlawful disclosure of insider information is another form of market abuse that occurs when confidential information is shared with others who may use it to gain an unfair advantage. The MAD requires companies to disclose any inside information that may affect the value of their securities to the public in a timely and accurate manner. Market manipulation is the act of artificially inflating or deflating the price of a financial instrument through false or misleading transactions. The MAD prohibits any activity that gives false or misleading signals about the supply, demand, or price of a financial instrument.

== Implementation ==
The MAD is implemented through national legislation in each EU member state, with regulatory bodies responsible for its enforcement. These regulators have the power to investigate and prosecute any suspected cases of market abuse, impose sanctions, and cooperate with other international regulators to share information and coordinate their efforts. The MAD also requires market participants, such as investment firms, credit institutions, and trading venues, to put in place procedures and controls to prevent and detect market abuse. They are also required to report any suspicious transactions to the relevant authorities.

== Effects ==
Since its implementation, the MAD has played a crucial role in promoting market transparency and fairness in the EU financial markets. It has helped to improve investor protection and confidence, which is crucial for the functioning of the financial system. The revised MAD II has further strengthened the EU's ability to detect and prevent market abuse, especially with the introduction of stricter sanctions and the expansion of its scope to cover new financial instruments and techniques.

== Criticism ==
The MAD has faced criticism for its narrow definition of market abuse and its lack of clear guidelines on some aspects of market manipulation. Some have argued that the legislation only covers a limited range of abusive behaviors and fails to address new forms of market manipulation, such as high-frequency trading and algorithmic trading.
