= Transelectrica =

Transelectrica SA
- Company type: Public
- Traded as: BVB: TEL
- Industry: Electricity
- Founded: 2000
- Headquarters: Bucharest, Romania
- Key people: Horia Hăhăianu (CEO)
- Services: Electric power transmission
- Revenue: US$1.2 billion (2007)
- Net income: 17,400,000 euro (2018)
- Number of employees: 2,156 (2007)
- Website: www.transelectrica.ro

Transelectrica is an electricity transmission system operator in Romania. It is publicly traded company with 58,69% of the shares being held by the Ministry of Economy and Commerce, 13,5% by Fondul Proprietatea, and 27,81% being floated on the Bucharest Stock Exchange or held by other investors. It is listed at the Bucharest Stock Exchange.

Transelectrica is organized in eight territorial transmission branches and one more branch acting as a metering operator for the electricity traded on the wholesale market. Transelectrica also has subsidiaries that take care of different administration tasks.

== Branches ==
- ST Bucharest which includes Buzău, Călărași, Dâmbovița, Giurgiu, Ialomița, Ilfov, Prahova, and Teleorman counties and the city of Bucharest. It operates 1,240 km of power lines.
- ST Constanța which includes Constanța, Tulcea, Galați, Brăila counties and partially that of Ialomița and Vrancea counties. It operates 900 km of power lines.
- ST Pitești which includes Argeș, Olt and Vâlcea counties. It operates 1,200 km of power lines.
- ST Craiova which includes Dolj, Gorj and Mehedinți counties. It operates 1,528 km of power lines.
- ST Timișoara which includes Timiș, Arad, Caraș-Severin and Hunedoara counties. It operates 1,100 km of power lines.
- ST Sibiu which includes Alba, Sibiu, Mureș, Harghita, Covasna and Brașov counties. It includes 987 km of power lines.
- ST Bacău which includes Suceava, Iași, Neamț, Vaslui, Bacău, Vrancea, Botoșani counties. It operates 1,051 km of power lines.
- ST Cluj which includes Cluj, Bihor, Maramureș, Satu Mare and Sălaj counties. It operates 952 km of power lines.

Transelectrica SA is the first state-owned company listed on the Bucharest Stock Exchange from the programme "A Powerful Market" that the Romanian Government has initiated in order to float some public companies on the capital market. Now the company has a capitalization of approximately 1.1 billion €.

== Subsidiaries ==
- OPCOM – The Power Market Operator – OPCOM SA ("Operatorul Pietei de Energie Electrica" SA) was set up based on the GD no. 627/2000 as a subsidiary whose sole shareholder is Transelectrica. The mission of this company consists of providing an organized framework for electricity commercial trades.
- SMART – The company for transmission grid maintenance services SMART SA was established through the reorganization of Transelectrica as an entirely owned branch according to the GD no. 710/2001. The area of expertise of SMART SA is performing revisions and repairs for primary and secondary equipment from the transmission network, including prophylactic measurements, remedying incidents at electrical installations, rendering services in the energy field, micro-production of electric equipment.
- FORMENERG – The area of expertise of FORMENERG SA subsidiary consists of training activities for personnel in the energy sector. FORMENERG SA was established on 1 April 2002 as a subsidiary 100% owned by Transelectrica.
- TELETRANS – SC TELETRANS SA is a subsidy (of TRANSELECTRICA SA) having as main activity field IT and communications services for the administration of electrical transport networks for electrical transport networks administration. TELETRANS is operational since January 2003.
- ICEMENERG – In September 2003 through the GD no. 1065/2003 concerning the reorganization of the National Company "Transelectrica" SA and the "ICEMENERG" SA company by merger through absorption, was approved the reorganization of ICEMENERG SA as a subsidiary 100% owned by Transelectrica. ICEMENERG SA renders services in the field of thermo-electric power stations, electric substations and networks.
- ICEMENERG SERVICE – In 2004, through the government decision on the reorganisation of the National Power Grid Company Transelectrica SA and ICEMENERG SERVICE SA, by merger through absorption, there was approved the reorganisation of ICEMENERG SERVICE SA as a subsidiary 100% owned by Transelectrica.

== See also ==
- List of Romanian companies
- BET-10
