= SIVECO Romania =

SIVECO Romania S.A.
- Company type: Private
- Industry: Computer software
- Founded: 1992
- Headquarters: Bucharest, Romania
- Products: enterprise software
- Number of employees: over 1300 worldwide
- Website: siveco.ro

SIVECO Romania is the leading business software development company located in Bucharest, Romania, and one of the most successful software integrators in Central and Eastern Europe. In 2013 it reached a revenue of EUR 89 mil. The company develops and exports software products and high value added consultancy projects to countries within the European Community, The Middle East, North Africa and the CIS area, such as UAE, Kuwait, North Macedonia, Egypt, Azerbaijan, Morocco, Lebanon, Cyprus, Turkey, Kazakhstan and Bulgaria. SIVECO Romania is also deploying over 20 projects for European Commission organisations.

Addressing large companies and public agencies, SIVECO Romania provides eLearning, eHealth, eAgriculture, eCustoms, eBusiness solutions, both nationally and internationally. SIVECO Romania is specialized in developing large and complex IT projects.

In 2005 Intel Capital and Polish Enterprise Fund V (PEF V), administered by Enterprise Investors, the largest investment fund in Central and Eastern Europe, acquired a 32.5% share in SIVECO Romania for $12 mil. The company's main shareholders are: Siveco Netherlands B.V. with a 42.2% share, PEF V with 22.5%, Intel Capital with 10%, and SIVECO Romania Management Team with 25,3%. SIVECO Romania is not yet a publicly traded corporation, but it intends to become one.
