= Romanian Financial Supervisory Authority =

Romanian governmental agency

Agency overview
- Formed: April 2013; 13 years ago
- Headquarters: Bucharest
- Agency executive: Alexandru Petrescu, President
- Website: https://www.asfromania.ro/en/

The Romanian Financial Supervisory Authority (Romanian: Autoritatea de Supraveghere Financiară, ASF) is the national government agency responsible for financial regulation in Romania. Its mandate is to regulate, supervise, and control non-bank markets in Romania.

Under European Union policy frameworks, the ASF is a voting member of the respective Boards of Supervisors of the European Insurance and Occupational Pensions Authority (EIOPA) and European Securities and Markets Authority (ESMA). It is also a member of the European Systemic Risk Board (ESRB).

== History ==
The Authority was founded on April 26, 2013 through the merger of three prior regulatory bodies that had covered the same area of responsibility - the National Securities Commission (CNVM, est. 1994), Insurance Supervisory Commission (CSA, est. 2001), and Private Pension System Supervisory Commission (CSSP, est. 2005).

== Governance and operations ==
The ASF is under the control of the Romanian Parliament. It has three areas of activity, insurance-reinsurance, capital markets, and private pensions.

It is run by a council of nine members, with five of the nine in executive positions: a president, a head vice president, and three vice presidents for sectors: insurance-reinsurance, capital markets and private pensions.

=== Presidents ===
- Dan Radu Rușanu (April 2013 - March 2014)
- Mișu Negrițoiu (April 2014 - May 2017)
- Leonardo Badea (June 2017 - October 2019)
- Nicu Marcu (June 2020 - December 2023)
- Alexandru Petrescu (December 2023 - present)

== See also ==
- List of financial supervisory authorities by country
