= Romstal =

Romanian construction equipment company

- Company type: private
- Industry: distribution
- Founded: 1994
- Headquarters: Bucharest, Romania
- Key people: Enrico Perini, CEO
- Products: sanitation equipment
- Revenue: € 111 million (2015)
- Number of employees: 1,100 (2015)
- Website: http://www.romstal.ro

Romstal is a Romanian company specialized in the sale of installation equipment for construction. The company's portfolio is grouped into 6 categories of interest, managed by specialized divisions - Thermo, Klima, Hydro, Sanni, Electro and Ceramic, and the product offer includes over 20,000 items characterized by a world-recognized quality, which Romstal adopts as a policy of the market.

The company's shareholders are Enrico Perini, Italian with Romanian citizenship, who owns the majority of 51% of the shares, Framan SRL, based in Italy, with 40% of the total, and Ovidiu Henter, who owns 9% of the shares.

The company's staff benefit from permanent internal training supported by the Romstal Academy, which offers installers with different specializations, as well as other categories of customers, upon request, certified courses

Romstal is the biggest sanitaryware distributor in Romania and one of the largest in Eastern Europe with 154 stores located in Romania, Ukraine, Serbia, Moldova and Bulgaria. The company also provides electrical and insulation materials.

In 2007 the company acquired the Serbian sanitation equipment retailer Doming for an estimated € 10 million.

== Romstal in Europe ==
Romstal operates stores in five European countries.

Country	No. of stores
Romania	97
Ukraine	19
Serbia	16
Moldova	12
Bulgaria	10
