= Total return index =

A total return index is an index that measures the performance of a group of components by assuming that all cash distributions are reinvested, in addition to tracking the components' price movements. While it is common to refer to equity based indices, there are also total return indices for bonds and commodities.

A total return index (TRI) is different from a price return index. A price return index only considers price movements (capital gains or losses) of the securities that make up the index, while a total return index includes dividends, interest, rights offerings and other distributions realized over a given period of time. Looking at an index's total return is usually considered a more accurate measure of performance. Typically, taxation is different between capital gains and dividends, so that the total return index only forms a rough approximation of what a long term investor can expect to keep after taxation.

Many stock indexes are calculated as a price return index and a total return index as well: The US stock index S&P 500 is an example of a price return index and the German stock market index DAX is an example of a total return index.

The TRI is also used to develop a portfolio as a weighted combination of assets, as it is described in modern portfolio theory. Though this theory is working with historical data, the models following this theory are trying to calculate the expected return based on a selected combination of assets. For example, in this way a stock portfolio representing a part of a stock index can be compared with the performance version of the stock index.
