= Economy of Romania =

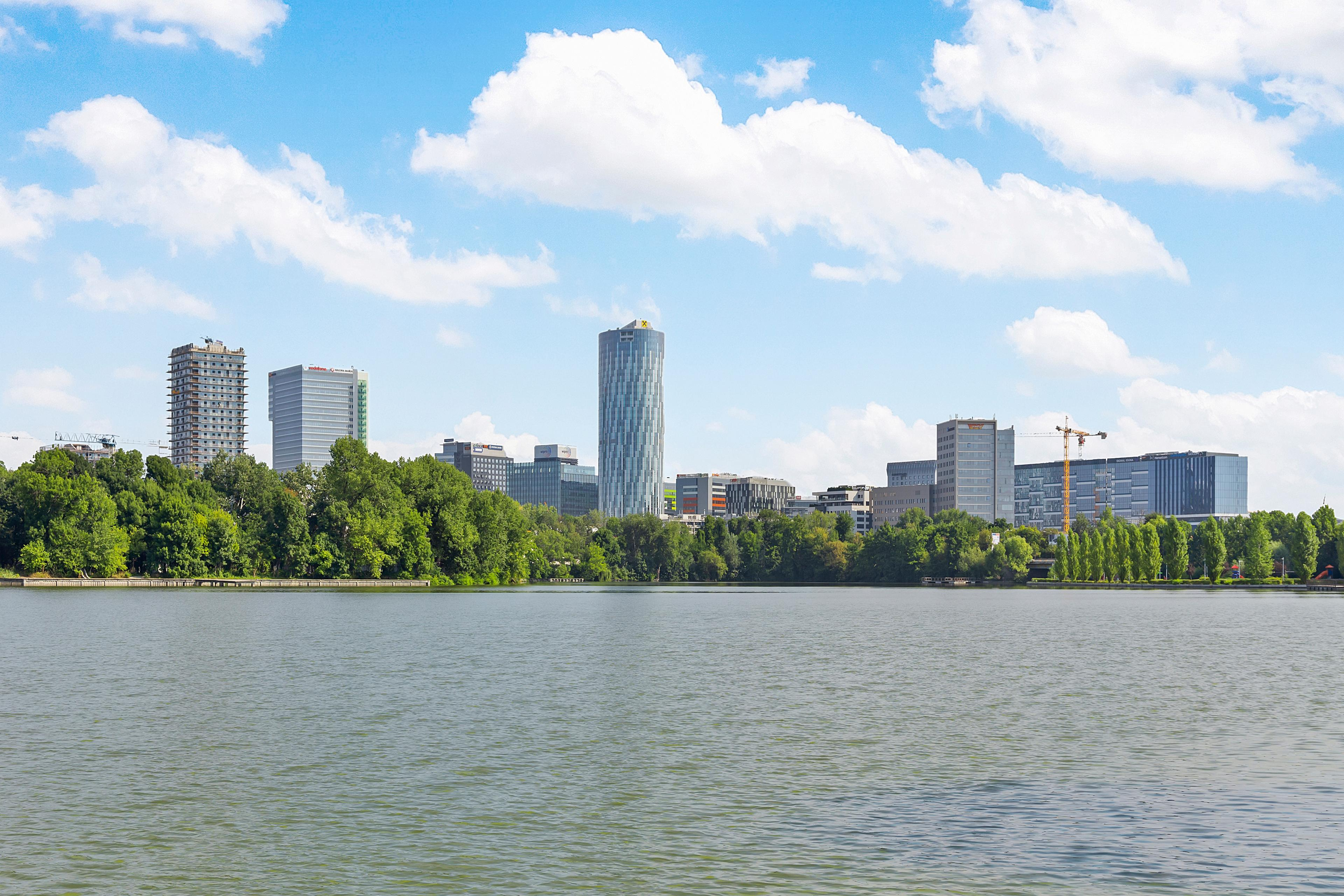
- Bucharest, the financial center of Romania
- Currency: Romanian leu (RON)
- Fiscal year: Calendar year
- Trade organisations: EU, WTO and BSEC
- Country group: Developing country; High-income economy

Statistics
- Population: ▼19,036,031 (2025)
- GDP: ▲$480 billion (nominal; 2026); ▲$949 billion (PPP; 2026)
- GDP rank: 38st (nominal, 2026); 38th (PPP, 2026)
- GDP growth: 0.9% (2025); 0.7% (2026)
- GDP per capita: ▲$25,690 (nominal, 2026); ▲$50,750 (PPP, 2026)
- GDP per capita rank: 53rd (nominal, 2026); 45th (PPP, 2026)
- GDP per capita growth: 0.8% (2025)
- GDP by sector: agriculture: 3.3%; industry: 25%; services: 62.5%; (2024)
- Inflation (CPI): 8.5% (2025)
- Population below national poverty line: 21.1% (2022)
- Gini coefficient: ▼29.8 low (2023)
- Human Development Index: ▲0.845 very high (2023) (55th); ▲0.758 high IHDI (46th) (2023)
- Corruption Perceptions Index: ▼45 out of 100 points (2025, 70th)
- Labour force: ▲7.742 million (2025); ▲69.5% employment rate (2024)
- Labour force by occupation: agriculture: 11.4%; industry & constr.: 23.0%; services: 65.5%; (2025)
- Unemployment: ▼5.9% (2025)
- Average gross salary: RON 9,078 / €1,783 / $2,061 monthly (November 2025)
- Average net salary: RON 5,443 / €1,069 / $1,236 monthly (November 2025)
- Main industries: Electric machinery and equipment, auto assembly, textiles and footwear, light machinery, metallurgy, chemicals, food processing, petroleum refining, mining, timber, construction materials.

External
- Exports: ▼$100.31 billion (2024); (40th)
- Export goods: List: Electrical machines and equipment; Transport vehicles and materials; Metals and metal articles; Plastic and rubber materials; Vegetable products; Footwear, textiles and hats; Food products, drinks and tobacco; Optical, photographic, cinematographic and surgical devices; Chemical and mineral products; Wood products (furniture); Livestock and animal products; Paper; Stone; plaster and ceramic articles; Leather, furs, fats and oils; Refined petroleum
- Main export partners: Germany 18.4%; Italy 8.5%; France 7%; United Kingdom 4.8%; Hungary 3.9%; Turkey 3.8%; Poland 3.69%; United States 3.67%; Czech Republic 3.3%; Netherlands 2.8% (2024)
- Imports: ▼$136.41 billion (2024) (38th)
- Import goods: List: Electrical machines and equipment; Mechanical appliances, nuclear reactors, boilers, and parts thereof; Vehicles other than railway or tramway rolling stock, and parts & accessories thereof; Mineral fuels, mineral oils and products of their distillation; Plastics and articles thereof; Pharmaceutical products; Iron, steel & articles thereof; Optical, photographic, cinematographic instruments and apparatus; Miscellaneous chemical products; Crude petroleum
- Main import partners: Germany 18%; Italy 8%; Hungary 6.5%; China 6.36%; Poland 6.33%; Turkey 5.7%; Bulgaria 4.4%; Netherlands 4.19%; France 4.14%; Austria 3% (2024)
- FDI stock: ▲€100.288 / $114.068 billion (31 Dec 2021); ▲ Abroad: €2.793 / $3.177 billion (31 Dec 2021)
- Current account: −8% of GDP (2025); −$33.675 billion (2025)
- Gross external debt: €221.2 billion (2025)

Public finance
- Government debt: 61.2% of GDP (2025); $258.58 billion (2025)
- Foreign reserves: €65.347 billion (2025) (33rd)
- Budget balance: −8% of GDP (2024); $−33.675 billion (2024)
- Revenue: 31.04% of GDP (2024); $131.15 billion (2024)
- Spending: 36.62% of GDP (2024); $154.72. billion (2024)
- Economic aid: €30.84 billion from European Structural and Investment Funds (2014–2020)
- Credit rating: Standard & Poor's (2025): BBB− (Domestic); A-3 (Foreign); A− (T&C Assessment); Outlook: Negative; Moody's (2025): Baa3; Outlook: Negative; Fitch (2025): BBB−; Outlook: Negative
- All values, unless otherwise stated, are in US dollars.

Romania has a high-income market economy that has achieved rapid convergence toward European Union standards since joining in 2007, with per capita income rising from 26% of the EU average in 2000 to 78% by 2024, driven by foreign direct investment in manufacturing and services amid post-communist reforms.

Romania's nominal GDP reached approximately $423 billion in 2024, reflecting real growth of 0.9% that year after 2.1% in 2023, propelled by sectors such as automotive industry, information technology outsourcing, and agriculture, though constrained by weak private investment and a widening trade deficit.

Notable trends include sustained employment expansion and growth in high-value industries, yet significant challenges persist, including high fiscal deficits projected at 8.6% of GDP in 2025, corruption hindering institutional efficiency, and significant labor emigration exacerbating skills shortages and demographic pressures.

== History ==
=== Before World War II ===
Prior to unification in 1859, the economies of Wallachia and Moldavia were predominantly agrarian, with agriculture employing the vast majority of the population and serving as the primary source of exports, particularly cereals shipped via the Danube to Western Europe. Oil extraction began in rudimentary form in the mid-19th century, with the first systematic refinery operational near Ploiești by 1857, marking Romania as the site of the world's inaugural recorded petroleum production of approximately 275 tonnes annually. Following independence in 1878 and the establishment of the Kingdom in 1881, foreign direct investment primarily from Germany, France, and United Kingdom fueled early resource extraction, though the economy remained overwhelmingly rural, with limited infrastructure and social relations stunted by feudal legacies.

Modern industrialization accelerated from 1886 onward, driven by legislative incentives like the 1887 mining law that encouraged foreign capital while prioritizing extractive sectors. Industrial output expanded 9.6-fold between 1893 and 1913, with annual growth averaging 4.3%, propelled by oil production surging from 25,000 tons in 1887 to 1.848 million tons in 1913 and electricity generation capacity rising from 851 kW in 1888 to 61,657 kW by 1913. By 1913, Romania's GDP per capita reached 1,253 USD (in 2000 purchasing power parity terms), with agriculture comprising 56% of goods value added and manufacturing 35.3%, reflecting a gradual shift from subsistence farming toward export-oriented resource industries amid overall economic growth indexed at 217 relative to the 1862–1866 base of 100.

The interwar period, following territorial expansion into Greater Romania after World War I which tripled the land area and increased the population to about 18 million, saw initial recovery hampered by war devastation and hyperinflation, but average annual GDP growth of 5.8% from 1920 to 1929 supported modernization efforts, including land reforms redistributing estates to over 1 million peasant households between 1918 and 1921. Agriculture retained dominance, contributing 37.82% of value added in 1929 and employing around 70–80% of the workforce, while industry expanded to 27–30% of value added by the mid-1920s, bolstered by extraction of petroleum that doubled from pre-war levels by 1924 and overtook cereals as the leading export by 1930. The Great Depression inflicted severe contraction, with GDP per capita falling at -3.18% annually from 1930 to 1932, triggering industrial slumps and rural distress, though recovery averaged 3.4% yearly GDP growth from 1934 to 1939 via protectionist policies and bilateral trade deals emphasizing raw material exports. These foundations rooted in agrarian exports, oil dependency, and nascent heavy industry positioned Romania as a peripheral European economy reliant on foreign capital and vulnerable to global shocks.

=== Communist period ===
After 1945, Soviet-occupied Romania became a member of the Eastern Bloc and switched to a Soviet-style command economy. During this period the country experienced rapid industrialisation in an attempt to create a "multilaterally developed socialist society". Economic growth was further fuelled by foreign credits in the 1970s, eventually leading to a growing foreign debt, which peaked at $11–12 billion.

Romania's debt was completely paid off during the 1980s by implementing severe austerity measures which deprived Romanians of basic consumer goods. Before austerity, Romania had made considerable progress in many areas. Between 1950 and 1973 Romania joined Yugoslavia and Bulgaria in achieving average annual growth rates that were above both the Central European and the West European average. During the first 3 post-war decades Romania industrialized faster than Spain, Greece, and Portugal. The infant mortality rate plummeted from 139 per 1,000 during the interwar period to 35 in the 1970's. During the interwar period half the population was illiterate but under the communist government illiteracy was eradicated. The population became urbanized, women's rights greatly improved, life expectancy grew, among many other achievements. In 1989, before the Romanian Revolution, Romania had a GDP of about 800 billion lei, or $53.6 billion. Around 58% of the country's gross national income came from industry, and another 15% came from agriculture. The minimum wage was 2,000 lei, or approx. $57.

=== Free market transition ===
The end of the communist period marked the beginning of a sharp economic downturn. Romania's weight in the global economy dropped to 0.3% in 1993, down from 0.8% in 1983.

Privatisation of industry started with the 1992 transfer of 30% of the shares of some 6,000 state-owned enterprises to five private ownership funds, in which each adult citizen received certificates of ownership. The remaining 70% ownership of the enterprises was transferred to a state ownership fund, with a mandate to sell off its shares at the rate of at least 10% per year. The privatisation law also called for direct sale of some 30 specially selected enterprises and the sale of "assets" (i.e., commercially viable component units) of larger enterprises.

As of 2008, inflation stood at 7.8%, up from 4.8% in 2007 estimated by the BNR at coming within 6% for the year 2006 (the year-on-year CPI, published in March 2007, is 3.66%). Also, since 2001, the economy has grown steadily at around 6–8%. Therefore, the PPP per capita GDP of Romania in 2008 was estimated to be between $12,200 and $14,064.

Romania was the largest U.S. trading partner in Central-Eastern Europe until Nicolae Ceaușescu's 1988 renunciation of Most Favored Nation (non-discriminatory) trading status, which resulted in higher U.S. tariffs on Romanian products. Congress approved restoration of the MFN status effective 8 November 1993, as part of a new bilateral trade agreement. Tariffs on most Romanian products dropped to zero in February 1994 with the inclusion of Romania in the Generalized System of Preferences (GSP). Major Romanian exports to the U.S. include shoes and clothing, steel, and chemicals.

Romania signed an Association Agreement with the EU in 1992 and a free trade agreement with the European Free Trade Association (EFTA) in 1993, codifying Romania's access to European markets and creating the basic framework for further economic integration. Romania formally joined the EU in 2007.

During the later part of the Ceaușescu period, Romania had earned significant contracts from several developing countries, notably Iraq, for oil-related projects. In August 2005 Romania agreed to forgive 43% of the US$1.7 billion debt owed by an Iraq still largely occupied by the military forces of the U.S.-led "Coalition of the Willing", making Romania the first country outside of the Paris Club of wealthy creditor nations to forgive Iraqi debts.

Growth in 2000–07 was supported by exports to the EU, primarily to Italy and Germany, and a strong recovery of foreign and domestic investment. Domestic demand is playing an ever more important role in underpinning growth as interest rates drop and the availability of credit cards and mortgages increases. Current account deficits of around 2% of GDP are beginning to decline as demand for Romanian products in the European Union increases. Accession to the EU gives further impetus and direction to structural reform.

In early 2004 the government passed increases in the value-added tax (VAT) and tightened eligibility for social benefits with the intention to bring the public finance gap down to 4% of GDP by 2006, but more difficult pension and healthcare reforms will have to wait until after the next elections. Privatisation of the state-owned bank Banca Comercială Română took place in 2005. Intensified restructuring among large enterprises, improvements in the financial sector, and effective use of available EU funds is expected to accelerate economic growth. However, the Romanian economy was affected by the 2008 financial crisis and contracted in 2009.

After communism, Romania needed capital infusion, entrepreneurial and managerial skills, the fastest way to obtain that was through foreign direct investment (FDI). As of 2018, total FDI in Romania was 81 billion EUR, 63% of total (51 billion) are greenfield investments. Top ten FDI stock by country of origin in 2018 were: Netherlands (23.9%), Germany (12.7%), Austria (12.2%), Italy (9.5%), Cyprus (6.2%), France (6%), Switzerland (4.5%), Luxembourg (4.2%), Belgium (2.2%) and United Kingdom (2.1%).

=== Investments in Romania ===
The level of investment remains above EU average. Investment accounts for almost 25% of GDP in Romania as opposed to 19% of GDP in the EU, in 2016.

Locally, UniCredit, one of the region's leading banking firms, announced in October 2023 that it will merge its Romanian affiliate with the recently purchased Alpha bank in Romania (for €300 million), creating Romania's third-largest lender.

Romania's Recovery and Resilience Plan dedicates over €6 billion to digitalisation efforts, encompassing public administration, connectivity, cybersecurity, digital skills, and the development of an integrated e-health and telemedicine system. The European Investment Bank Project Advisory Support programme aids Romania in advancing digitalisation through collaborations with the National Agency for Public Procurement and the Ministry of Research, Innovation, and Digitalisation

This assistance includes evaluating ICT projects and supporting the rollout of a €600 million government cloud initiative, aimed at enhancing interoperability, reducing bureaucracy, and bolstering cybersecurity.

=== EU membership (2007) ===
Eurozone participation European Union member states (special territories not shown) 21 in the eurozone 1 in ERM II, with an opt-out (Denmark) 5 not in ERM II, but committed to join the eurozone after meeting the convergence criteria (Czech Republic, Hungary, Poland, Romania, and Sweden) Non–EU member states 4 using the euro with a monetary agreement (Andorra, Monaco, San Marino, and Vatican City) 2 using the euro unilaterally (Kosovo and Montenegro)

On 1 January 2007 Romania and Bulgaria entered the EU, giving the Union access to the Black Sea. This led to some immediate international trade liberalisation. Romania is part of the European single market which represents more than 447 million consumers. Several domestic commercial policies are determined by agreements among European Union members and by EU legislation. This is to be contrasted with enormous current account deficits. Low interest rates guarantee availability of funds for investment and consumption. For example, a boom in the real estate market started around 2000 and has not subsided yet. At the same time annual inflation in the economy is variable and during the mid-2000s (2003–2008) has seen a low of 2.3% and high of 7.8%.

Romania adopted 1 January 2005 a flat tax of 16% to improve tax collection rates. Romania subsequently enjoyed the lowest fiscal burden in the European Union, until Bulgaria also switched to a flat tax of 10% in 2007. Since 2018 the flat rate was lowered to 10%.

Romania posted 6% economic growth in 2016, the highest among European Union member states. According to Bloomberg, the country's economic growth advanced at the fastest pace since 2008. It is now considered the next tech-startup hub country in EU. Nowadays, that Romania's digital infrastructure ranks higher than other eastern and central European countries makes it an attractive place to start a tech business.

== Economy ==
=== GDP ===
IMF for 2022 (October) published the following data:

| Year | 2022 | 2023 | 2024 | 2025 | 2026 | 2027 |
|---|---|---|---|---|---|---|
| $/per capita (PPP) | 38 | 40,673 | 43,100 | 45,445 | 47,940 | 50,573 |
| $/per capita (Nominal) | 15 | 16,228 | 17,566 | 18,935 | 20,263 | 21,665 |

In the Romanian press the economy has been referred to as the "Tiger of the East" during the 2000s. Romania is a country of considerable economic potential: over 10 million hectares of agricultural land, diverse energy sources (coal, oil, natural gas, hydro, nuclear, and wind), a substantial, if aging, manufacturing base and opportunities for expanded development in tourism on the Black Sea and in the mountains.

=== Investments ===
Net investments in Romania's economy totaled RON 33.6 billion (EUR 7.2 billion) in the first half of 2018, up by 5.8% compared to the same period of 2017, according to the National Statistics Institute (INS).

In the same year (2018) foreign direct investment (FDI) was 81 billion, 63% (51 billion) being "green field"

=== Data ===
The following table shows the main economic indicators in 1980–2025 (with IMF staff estimates in 2026–2031). Inflation under 5% is in green.

| Year | GDP (in Bil. US$ PPP) | GDP per capita (in US$ PPP) | GDP (in Bil. US$ nominal) | GDP per capita (in US$ nominal) | GDP growth (real) | Inflation rate (in Percent) | Unemployment (in Percent) | Government debt (in % of GDP) |
|---|---|---|---|---|---|---|---|---|
| 1980 | 118.9 | 5,298 | 46.1 | 2,052 | ▲3.3% | ▲1.5% | —N/a | —N/a |
| 1981 | ▲130.3 | ▲5,770 | ▲55.3 | ▲2,450 | ▲0.1% | ▲2.2% | —N/a | —N/a |
| 1982 | ▲143.7 | ▲6,336 | ▲55.4 | ▼2,441 | ▲3.9% | ▲16.9% | —N/a | —N/a |
| 1983 | ▲158.3 | ▲6,951 | ▼48.4 | ▼2,125 | ▲6.0% | ▲4.7% | —N/a | —N/a |
| 1984 | ▲173.9 | ▲7,603 | ▼39.1 | ▼1,710 | ▲6.0% | ▼−0.3% | —N/a | —N/a |
| 1985 | ▲179.2 | ▲7,800 | ▲48.3 | ▲2,102 | ▼−0.1% | ▼−0.2% | 4.0% | —N/a |
| 1986 | ▲187.2 | ▲8,105 | ▲52.3 | ▲2,264 | ▲2.4% | ▲0.7% | ▼3.9% | —N/a |
| 1987 | ▲193.3 | ▲8,325 | ▲58.5 | ▲2,518 | ▲0.8% | ▲1.1% | ▼3.7% | —N/a |
| 1988 | ▲199.2 | ▲8,531 | ▲60.5 | ▲2,593 | ▼−0.5% | ▲2.6% | 3.7% | —N/a |
| 1989 | ▼195.0 | ▼8,321 | ▼54.2 | ▼2,315 | ▼−5.8% | ▲0.9% | ▼3.4% | —N/a |
| 1990 | ▼190.9 | ▼8,138 | ▼38.5 | ▼1,642 | ▼−5.6% | ▲127.9% | 3.4% | —N/a |
| 1991 | ▼171.9 | ▼7,337 | ▼29.1 | ▼1,241 | ▼−12.9% | ▲161.1% | ▲3.5% | —N/a |
| 1992 | ▼160.4 | ▼6,873 | ▼19.8 | ▼848 | ▼−8.8% | ▲210.4% | ▲5.4% | —N/a |
| 1993 | ▲166.7 | ▲7,182 | ▲26.6 | ▲1,147 | ▲1.5% | ▲256.1% | ▲9.2% | —N/a |
| 1994 | ▲176.9 | ▲7,671 | ▲30.4 | ▲1,317 | ▲3.9% | ▲136.7% | ▲11.0% | —N/a |
| 1995 | ▲193.5 | ▲8,441 | ▲35.8 | ▲1,563 | ▲7.1% | ▲32.3% | ▼9.9% | —N/a |
| 1996 | ▲204.8 | ▲8,985 | ▼35.7 | ▲1,565 | ▲3.9% | ▲38.8% | ▼7.3% | —N/a |
| 1997 | ▼195.8 | ▼8,632 | ▼35.6 | ▲1,572 | ▼−6.1% | ▲154.8% | ▲7.9% | —N/a |
| 1998 | ▼188.4 | ▼8,351 | ▲42.5 | ▲1,885 | ▼−4.8% | ▲59.1% | ▲9.6% | —N/a |
| 1999 | ▲188.9 | ▲8,411 | ▼36.0 | ▼1,601 | ▼−1.2% | ▲45.8% | ▼7.2% | —N/a |
| 2000 | ▲198.8 | ▲8,854 | ▲37.4 | ▲1,668 | ▲2.9% | ▲45.7% | ▲7.6% | 29.6% |
| 2001 | ▲213.9 | ▲9,536 | ▲40.4 | ▲1,801 | ▲5.2% | ▲34.5% | ▼7.4% | ▼27.4% |
| 2002 | ▲229.6 | ▲10,517 | ▲46.0 | ▲2,108 | ▲5.7% | ▲22.5% | ▲8.3% | 27.4% |
| 2003 | ▲239.6 | ▲11,080 | ▲57.8 | ▲2,672 | ▲2.3% | ▲15.4% | ▼7.8% | ▼24.9% |
| 2004 | ▲271.7 | ▲12,627 | ▲75.1 | ▲3,488 | ▲10.4% | ▲11.9% | ▲8.0% | ▼21.3% |
| 2005 | ▲293.3 | ▲13,719 | ▲98.5 | ▲4,609 | ▲4.7% | ▲9.0% | ▼7.1% | ▼17.8% |
| 2006 | ▲326.7 | ▲15,367 | ▲122.1 | ▲5,745 | ▲8.0% | ▲6.6% | ▲7.2% | ▼12.7% |
| 2007 | ▲359.8 | ▲17,027 | ▲174.8 | ▲8,274 | ▲7.2% | ▲4.8% | ▼6.3% | ▼12.4% |
| 2008 | ▲400.9 | ▲19,425 | ▲215.6 | ▲10,446 | ▲9.3% | ▲7.8% | ▼5.6% | ▲13.0% |
| 2009 | ▼381.1 | ▼18,643 | ▼174.6 | ▼8,541 | ▼−5.5% | ▲5.6% | ▲8.4% | ▲22.5% |
| 2010 | ▼370.6 | ▼18,263 | ▼170.3 | ▼8,393 | ▼−3.9% | ▲6.1% | ▲9.0% | ▲30.2% |
| 2011 | ▲395.3 | ▲19,570 | ▲192.8 | ▲9,547 | ▲4.5% | ▲5.8% | ▲9.1% | ▲32.6% |
| 2012 | ▲410.3 | ▲20,418 | ▼179.2 | ▼8,919 | ▲1.9% | ▲3.3% | ▼8.7% | ▲36.2% |
| 2013 | ▲418.5 | ▲20,902 | ▲189.8 | ▲9,482 | ▲0.3% | ▲4.0% | ▲9.0% | ▲39.3% |
| 2014 | ▲443.3 | ▲22,222 | ▲200.0 | ▲10,026 | ▲4.1% | ▲1.1% | ▼8.6% | ▲40.5% |
| 2015 | ▲461.5 | ▲23,226 | ▼177.9 | ▼8,952 | ▲3.2% | ▼−0.6% | ▼8.4% | ▼39.4% |
| 2016 | ▲479.2 | ▲24,252 | ▲185.3 | ▲9,379 | ▲2.9% | ▼−1.6% | ▼7.2% | ▲39.5% |
| 2017 | ▲527.8 | ▲26,868 | ▲210.5 | ▲10,717 | ▲8.2% | ▲1.3% | ▼6.1% | ▼37.1% |
| 2018 | ▲572.2 | ▲29,293 | ▲242.0 | ▲12,388 | ▲5.4% | ▲4.6% | ▼5.3% | ▼36.4% |
| 2019 | ▲647.5 | ▲33,352 | ▲250.1 | ▲12,880 | ▲4.0% | ▲3.8% | ▼4.9% | ▲36.8% |
| 2020 | ▲658.8 | ▲34,081 | ▲251.0 | ▲12,984 | ▼−3.6% | ▲2.6% | ▲6.1% | ▲49.5% |
| 2021 | ▲724.2 | ▲37,716 | ▲285.3 | ▲14,857 | ▲5.6% | ▲5.0% | ▼5.6% | ▲51.8% |
| 2022 | ▲808.4 | ▲42,452 | ▲295.9 | ▲15,538 | ▲4.2% | ▲13.8% | 5.6% | ▲51.9% |
| 2023 | ▲857.7 | ▲45,009 | ▲347.8 | ▲18,254 | ▲2.3% | ▲10.4% | 5.6% | ▲52.6% |
| 2024 | ▲887.7 | ▲46,859 | ▲382.7 | ▲20,199 | ▲0.9% | ▲5.6% | ▼5.4% | ▲57.5% |
| 2025 | ▲917.2 | ▲48,166 | ▲429.3 | ▲22,543 | ▲0.7% | ▲7.3% | ▲6.1% | ▲60.4% |
| 2026 | ▲942.9 | ▲49,628 | ▲470.1 | ▲24,741 | ▼−0.5% | ▲8.2% | ▲6.5% | ▲62.6% |
| 2027 | ▲994.4 | ▲52,504 | ▲500.0 | ▲26,403 | ▲2.2% | ▲4.1% | ▼5.9% | ▲64.9% |
| 2028 | ▲1,040.2 | ▲55,124 | ▲534.9 | ▲28,347 | ▲2.5% | ▲4.3% | ▼5.8% | ▲66.1% |
| 2029 | ▲1,089.4 | ▲57,970 | ▲564.7 | ▲30,050 | ▲2.8% | ▲2.9% | ▼5.7% | ▲68.1% |
| 2030 | ▲1,141.5 | ▲61,020 | ▲596.6 | ▲31,892 | ▲2.9% | ▲2.6% | ▼5.6% | ▲69.8% |
| 2031 | ▲1,195.8 | ▲64,245 | ▲627.3 | ▲33,704 | ▲3.0% | ▲2.3% | ▼5.5% | ▲71.3% |

=== National budget ===
The planned national budget for 2017 is 422 billion lei ($103 billion), with an estimated budget deficit to GDP of 1.1%.

=== Growing middle class ===
Romania has a growing middle and upper classes with relatively high per-capita income. World Bank estimated that in 2002 99% of the urban and 94% of the rural population had access to electricity. In 2004, 91% of the urban and only 16% of the rural population had access to improved water supply and 94% of the urban population had access to improved sanitation. In 2017 there were about 22.5 million mobile phone users in Romania and about 18 million with internet access.

In February 2024, the gross average monthly wage was RON 8,871 (€1910), and the net average monthly wage was RON 5,556 (€1180).

=== Neighbours ===
Countries tend to benefit from sharing borders with developed markets as this facilitates trade and development. Below is a table of Romania's neighbouring countries, their GDP per capita, and trade values between the pairs. In 2017, 11.58% of Romanian exports went to its neighbours; while 12.95% of imports came from these five countries. For comparison, Germany alone accounted for 23% of Romania's exports and 20.1% of its imports.

| Country | GDP per capita, (current US$) 2022 | Difference in % |
|---|---|---|
| Hungary | 18,390 | +16.5 |
| Romania | 15,786 | |
| Bulgaria | 13,974 | −11.5 |
| Serbia | 9,537 | −39.6 |
| Moldova | 5,714 | −63.8 |
| Ukraine | 4,534 | −71.3 |

== Labour ==
In 2022, the economically active population was of 8270.8 thousand persons, of which 94.4% were employed persons and 5.6% unemployed.

The employment rate of working age population (15-64 years) was 63.1%, having higher values for men (71.5%, as against 54.4% for women) and urban area (68.6% in urban area, as against 56.3% in rural area). 19.7% of young people (aged 15-24 years) and 46.7% of elderly people (aged 55-64 years) were employed. The employment rate for persons aged 15-64 was higher for those with superior level of education (89.5%) than for those with medium level (64.6%) and those with low education (36.6%). The employment rate for the population aged 20-64 years was 68.5%. Employment rate had higher values for men (77.7% as against only 59.1% for women) and for persons in urban area (74.0% as against 61.8% for persons in rural area).

The unemployment rate was 5.6%. By gender, the gap between the two rates was 1.0 percentage point (6.0% for men as against 5.0% for women), while by residential area it was 5.7 percentage points (8.9% for rural area as compared to 3.2% for urban area). The unemployment rate had the highest level (22.8%) among young people (aged 15-24 years). The unemployment affects to a greater extent the graduates of medium and low level of education, for which the unemployment rate was 5.2%, respectively 14.2% higher as compared with the rate registered for unemployed with superior level of education (1.7%).

Note: Counties highlighted in purple on the map had long-term unemployment rates below 3% in March 2023, those in blue fell within the range of 3% to 5%, counties in orange fell within the range of 5% to 7%, and counties in red had unemployment rates of 7% and above.

According to the latest monthly report of the National Institute of Statistics in Romania, the average monthly salary in August 2025 was 9,002 lei (1,777 euros) gross or 5,387 lei (1,063 euros) net.

Note: Counties highlighted in purple on the map had an average net monthly salary (after tax) of €1000 and above in June 2025, those in blue fell within the range of €999 to €850, and counties in orange had average net monthly salaries below €850.

=== Minimum wage in Romania ===
The minimum gross wage in the Romanian economy amounts to RON 4050 (≈EUR 814) per month from 1 January 2025. The same minimum wage applies to employees with a seniority of over 15 years.

=== Wealth per adult ===
In 2021, the median wealth per adult in Romania was estimated by Credit Suisse at USD 20,389. Average wealth per adult was USD 42,351.

35% of the 15.1 million Romanian adults had a wealth of less than USD 10,000. This is an improvement from 40% in 2018.

== Tourism ==
Romania is a popular tourist destination, with more than 15.7 million domestic and foreign tourists in 2018.

Romania's tourism took a great hit during the 2020 COVID-19 pandemic, with a drop of as much as 68.7% of foreign visitors in 2020, but it's beginning to recover in 2022.

Romania has many cities of cultural interest including Sibiu, Bucharest, Constanța, Brașov, Iași, Timișoara, Cluj-Napoca, Alba Iulia, and Oradea. It also has many beaches, seaside resorts, ski resorts, and well-preserved rural regions which are appreciated for their beauty and tranquillity. Romania is the destination of many religious pilgrimages, hosting several thousands visitors each year.

== Currency ==
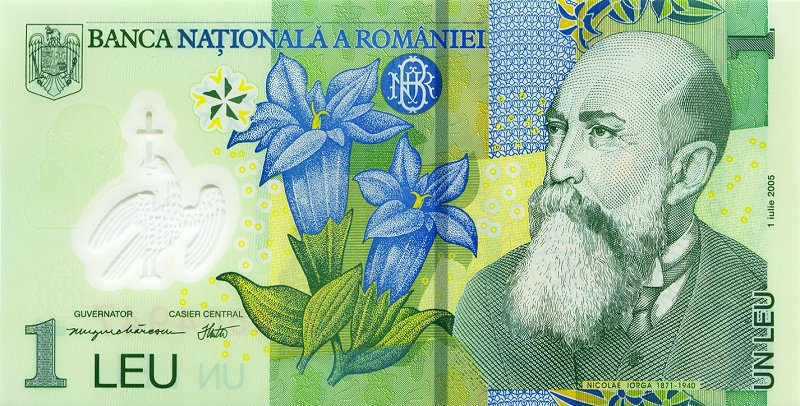
One new leu bank-note

The leu (pronounced [ˈlew]), plural: lei ([ˈlej]); (ISO 4217 code RON; numeric code 946), "leo" (lion) in English is the currency of Romania. It is subdivided into 100 bani (singular: ban). On 1 July 2005, Romania underwent a currency reform, switching from the previous leu (ROL) to a new leu (RON). 1 RON is equal to 10,000 ROL. Romania joined the European Union on 1 January 2007 and initially hoped to adopt the euro in 2014, but with the deepening of the Euro area crisis and with its own problems, such as a low workforce productivity, postponed its adoption plans indefinitely.

As of April 2025, 1 RON is worth about 0.2006 EUR and US$0.2278.

=== Fulfillment of the Maastricht criteria ===
Romania, as a member state of the European Union, is required to adopt the common European currency, the Euro. For this reason Romania must fulfil the five Maastricht criteria, of which it met none as of June 2020.

Convergence criteria
| Assessment date | Country | HICP inflation rate (Note: The rate of change of the 12-month average HICP over the prior 12-month average must be no more than 1.5% larger than the unweighted arithmetic average of the similar HICP inflation rates in the 3 EU member states with the lowest HICP inflation. If any of these 3 states have a HICP rate significantly below the similarly averaged HICP rate for the eurozone (which according to ECB practice means more than 2% below), and if this low HICP rate has been primarily caused by exceptional circumstances (i.e. severe wage cuts or a strong recession), then such a state is not included in the calculation of the reference value and is replaced by the EU state with the fourth lowest HICP rate.) | Excessive deficit procedure | | Exchange rate | | Long-term interest rate (Note: The arithmetic average of the annual yield of 10-year government bonds as of the end of the past 12 months must be no more than 2.0% larger than the unweighted arithmetic average of the bond yields in the 3 EU member states with the lowest HICP inflation. If any of these states have bond yields which are significantly larger than the similarly averaged yield for the eurozone (which according to previous ECB reports means more than 2% above) and at the same time does not have complete funding access to financial markets (which is the case for as long as a government receives bailout funds), then such a state is not to be included in the calculation of the reference value.) | Compatibility of legislation |
| Assessment date | Country | HICP inflation rate | Budget deficit to GDP | Debt-to-GDP ratio | ERM II member | Change in rate (Note: The change in the annual average exchange rate against the euro.) | Long-term interest rate | Compatibility of legislation |
| 2026 ECB Report (Note: Reference values from the Convergence Report of June 2026.) | Reference values | Max. 2.7% (Note: Cyprus, Denmark, and France were the reference states.) (as of May 2026) | None open (as of 17 June 2026) | | Min. 2 years (as of 17 June 2026) | Max. ±15% (Note: The maximum allowed change in rate is ± 2.25% for Denmark.) (for 2025) | Max. 5.1% (as of May 2026) | Compliant (as of 25 March 2026) |
| 2026 ECB Report | Reference values | Max. 2.7% (as of May 2026) | Max. 3.0% (FY 2025) | Max. 60% (FY 2025) | Min. 2 years (as of 17 June 2026) | Max. ±15% (for 2025) | Max. 5.1% (as of May 2026) | Compliant (as of 25 March 2026) |
|---|---|---|---|---|---|---|---|---|
| 2026 ECB Report | Romania | 8.4% | Open | | No | −1.4% | 6.7% | No |
| 2026 ECB Report | Romania | 8.4% | 7.9% | 59.3% | No | −1.4% | 6.7% | No |

Criterion fulfilled
Criterion potentially fulfilled: If the budget deficit exceeds the 3% limit, but is "close" to this value (the European Commission has deemed 3.5% to be close by in the past), then the criteria can still potentially be fulfilled if either the deficits in the previous two years are significantly declining towards the 3% limit, or if the excessive deficit is the result of exceptional circumstances which are temporary in nature (i.e. one-off expenditures triggered by a significant economic downturn, or by the implementation of economic reforms that are expected to deliver a significant positive impact on the government's future fiscal budgets). However, even if such "special circumstances" are found to exist, additional criteria must also be met to comply with the fiscal budget criterion. Additionally, if the debt-to-GDP ratio exceeds 60% but is "sufficiently diminishing and approaching the reference value at a satisfactory pace" it can be deemed to be in compliance.
Criterion not fulfilled

== Natural resources ==
Romania is an oil and gas producer. The pipeline network in Romania included 2,427 km for crude oil, 3,850 km for petroleum products, and 3,508 km for natural gas in 2006. Romania could cash in four billion dollars from the Constanta-Trieste pipeline.

Romania has considerable natural resources for a country of its size, including coal, iron ore, copper, chromium, uranium, antimony, mercury, gold, barite, borate, celestine (strontium), emery, feldspar, limestone, magnesite, marble, perlite, pumice, pyrites (sulfur), clay, arable land and hydropower.

Energy needs are also met by importing bituminous and anthracite coal and crude petroleum. In 2019 over 21 million metric tonnes of coal, an estimated 1300 tonnes of zinc, 460,000 tonnes of alumina and 3.4 million tonnes of crude steel were mined. Lesser amounts of copper, lead, gold, silver and kaolin were also mined.

=== Energy ===
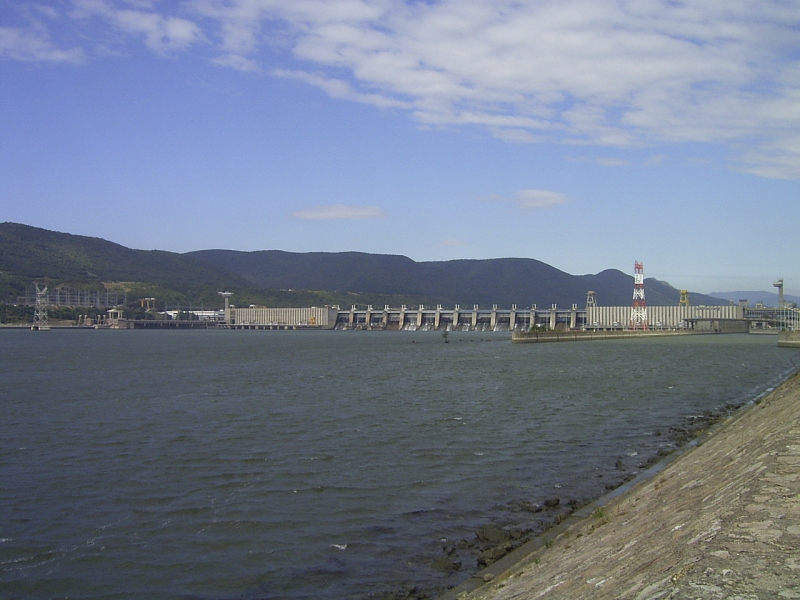
The Iron Gate I Hydro Power Plant, a joint venture between Romania and Serbia

The energy sector is dominated by state-owned companies such as Termoelectrica, Hidroelectrica and Nuclearelectrica. Fossil fuels are the country's primary source of energy, followed by hydroelectric power.

==== Nuclear energy in Romania ====
Due to dependency on oil and gas imports from Russia, the country has placed an increasingly heavy emphasis on nuclear energy since the 1980s. The Cernavodă Nuclear Power Plant is the only one of its kind in Romania, although there are plans to build a second one in Transylvania, possibly after 2020.

For domestic heating and cooking 48% of rural and small-town households use directly burned solid fuel (almost exclusively domestically produced wood) as the main energy source.

Wind power had an installed capacity of 76 MW in 2008, and 3028 MW in 2016. The country has the largest wind power potential in Southeast Europe, with Dobruja listed as the second-best place in Europe to construct wind farms. As a result, there are currently investor connection requests for over 12,000 MW. There are also plans to build a number of solar power stations, such as the Covaci Solar Park, which will be one of the largest in the world.

== Physical infrastructure ==
The current situation of motorways and expressways in Romania Completed Under construction (including design-build contracts) Tendered Environmental permit issued Planned

The volume of traffic in Romania, especially goods transportation, has increased in recent years due to its strategic location in South-East Europe. In the past few decades, much of the freight traffic shifted from rail to road. A further strong increase of traffic is expected in the future.

As of 11 July 2025, there are 1,314.472 km of highways in service (of which 1,181.435 km motorways and 133.037 km expressways), with another 753.882 km with signed contracts in various stages of execution, and another 669.3 km being tendered (29 May 2025).

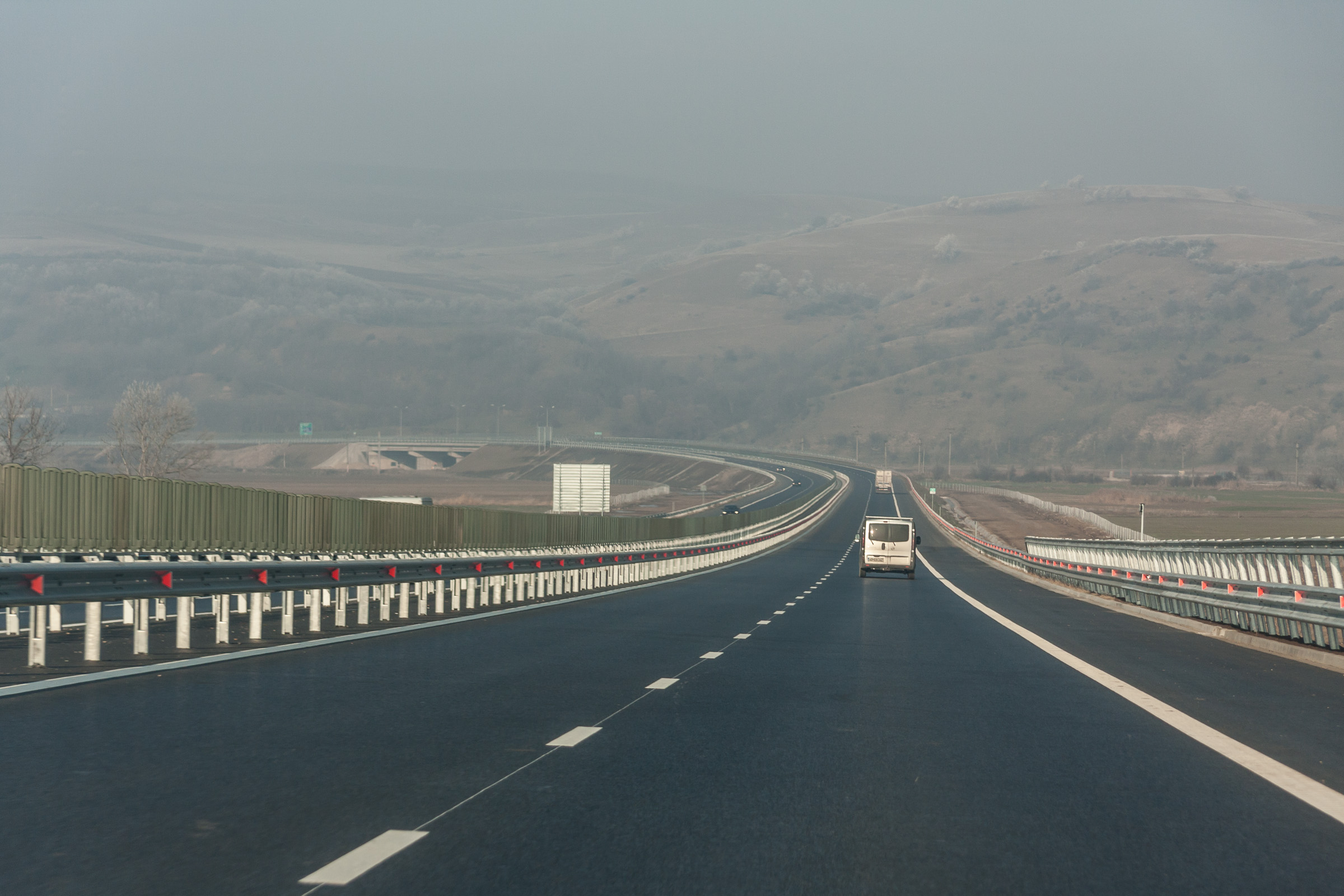
A1 motorway near Orăștie

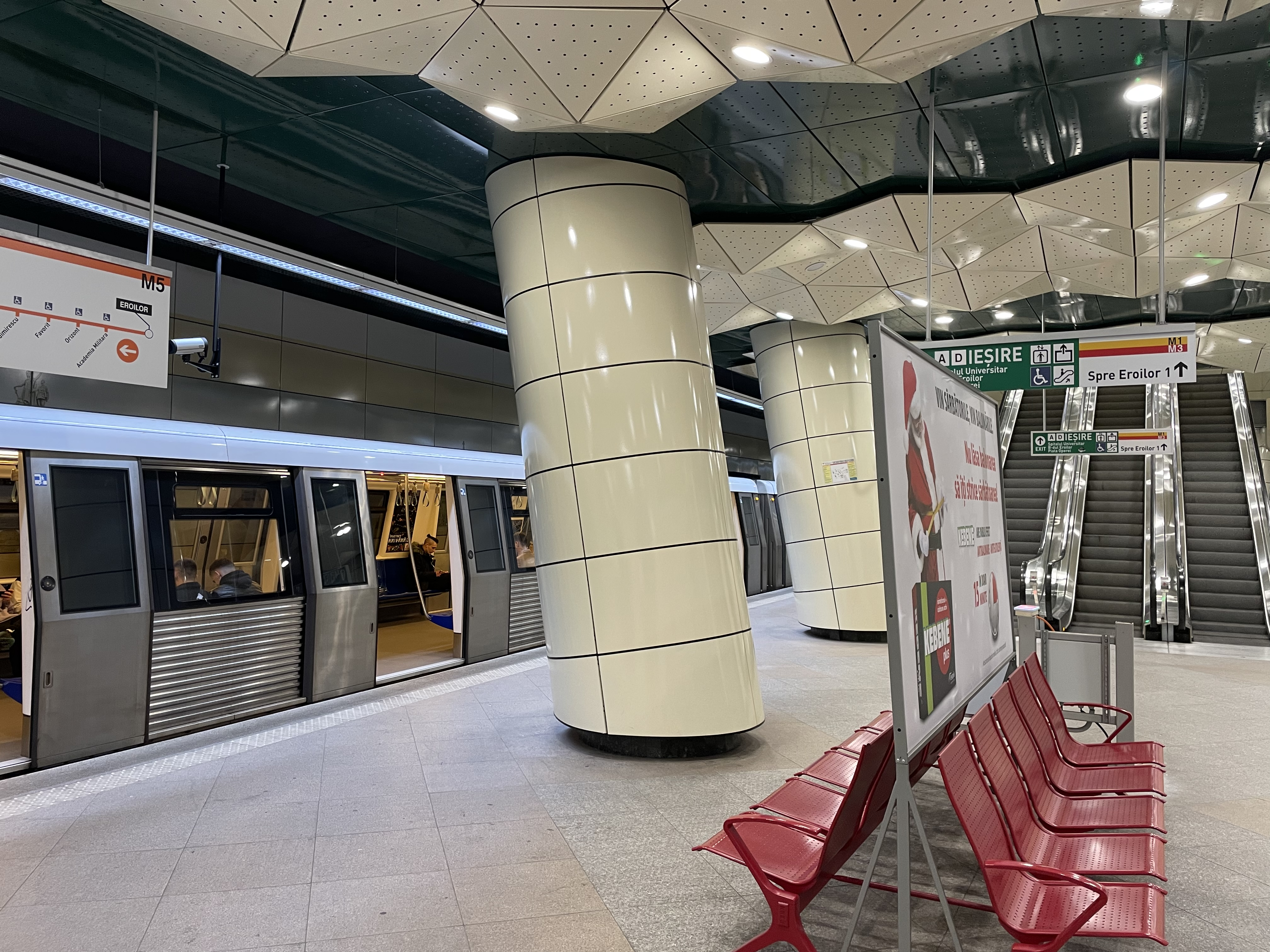
Metro at Eroilor 2 Station in 2022

Bucharest is the only city in Romania which has an underground railway system, comprising both the Bucharest Metro and the light rail system managed by Regia Autonomă de Transport București. Although construction was planned to begin in 1941, due to geo-political factors, the Bucharest Metro was only opened in 1979. The Bucharest Metro system is 80.1 kilometres (49.8 mi) long and has 64 stations. The Bucharest Metro has five lines (M1, M2, M3, M4, and M5). The newest metro line, M5, was opened in 2020. A sixth metro line, M6 line, is currently under construction. A second metro system, the Cluj-Napoca Metro, is under construction.

== Sectors of the economy ==
In 2022, the sector with the highest number of companies registered in Romania is Services with 351,621 companies followed by Retail Trade with 239,404 companies.

=== Gas and natural resources ===
Romania has become a natural gas exporter. Romanian Scientist, Lazăr Edeleanu, had managed in 1908, for the first time in the world, to refine oil based products with sulphur dioxide, in other words separation from the oil of some hydrocarbon groups, without their chemical alteration.

=== Agriculture ===
Agriculture employs about 26% of the population (one of the highest rates in Europe) and contributes about 4.3% of GDP. The Bărăgan is characterized by large wheat farms. Dairy products, pork, poultry, and apple production are concentrated in the western region.

Beef production is located in central Romania, while the production of fruits, vegetables, and wine ranges from central to southern Romania. Romania is a large producer of many agricultural products and is currently expanding its forestry and fishery industries. The implementation of the reforms and the Uruguay Round of the General Agreement on Tariffs and Trade (GATT) have resulted in reforms in the agricultural sector of the economy.

==== Fishing ====
Fishing is an economic mainstay in parts of eastern Romania and along the Black Sea coast, with important fish markets in places such as Constanta, Galați and Tulcea. Fish such as European anchovy, sprat, pontic shad, mullet, goby, whiting, garfish, Black-Sea Turbot or horse mackerel are landed at ports such as Constanta.

There has been a large scale decrease in employment in the fishing industry within Romania due to the EU's Common Fisheries Policy, which places restrictions on the total tonnage of catch that can be landed, caused by overfishing in the Black Sea. Along with the decline of sea-fishing, commercial fish farms – especially in salmon, have increased in prominence in the rivers and lochs of the east of Romania. Inland waters are rich in fresh water fish such as salmon, trout, and in particular, carp which traditionally has been the most popular fish, including its eggs (icre), fresh or canned.

=== Industry ===
==== Car industry ====
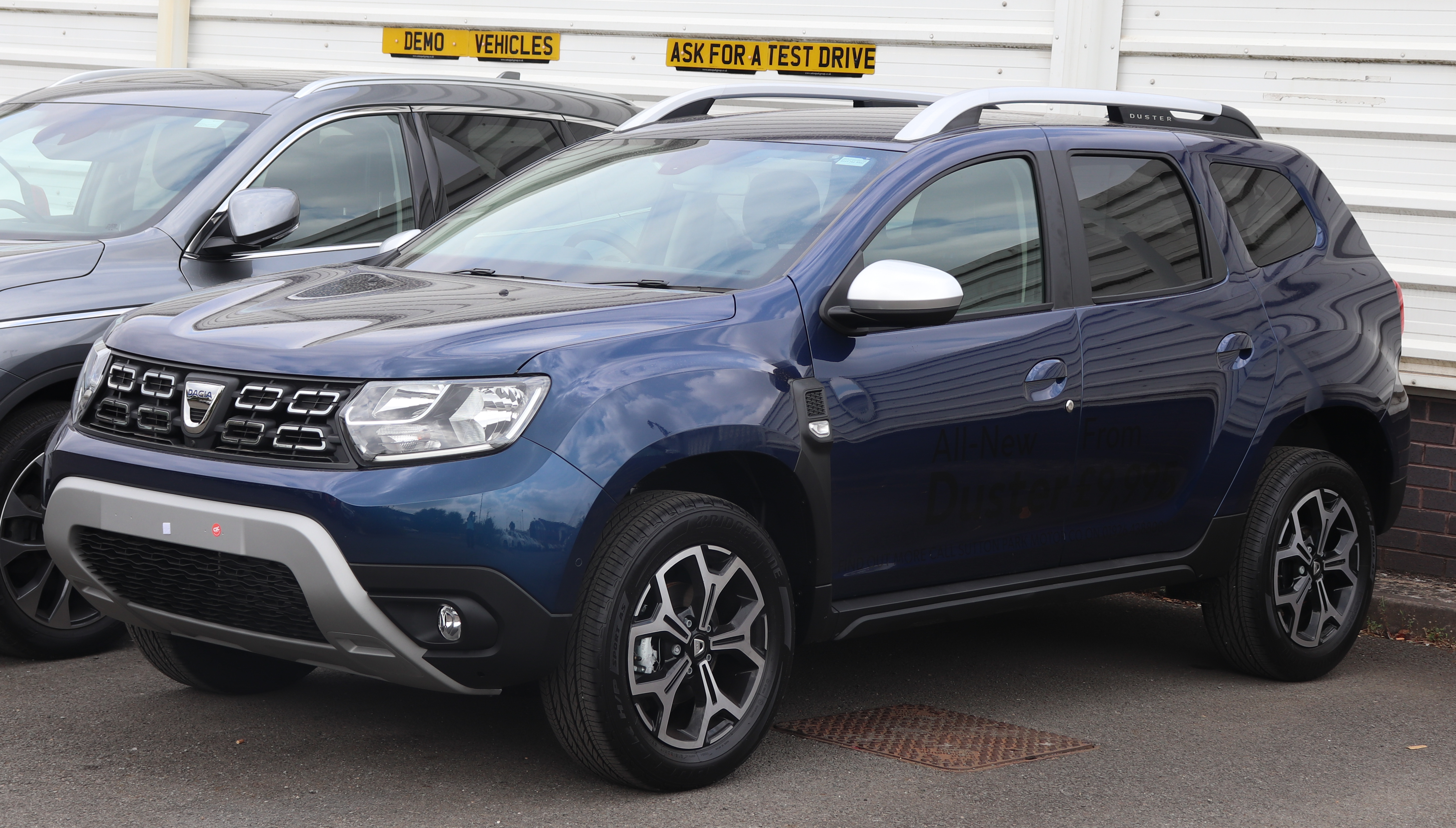
2018 Dacia Duster

==== IT and other Industry ====
Romania has been successful in developing its industrial sector in recent years. Industry and construction accounted for 32% of gross domestic product (GDP) in 2003, a comparatively large share even without taking into account related services. The sector employed 26.4% of the workforce. Romania produces automobiles, machine tools, and chemicals. In 2013, some 410,997 automobiles were produced in Romania, up from 78,165 in 2000. As of 2018, the turnover generated by Romania's automobile industry was estimated at 28 billion Euros, with 230,000 Romanians employed in the sector.

In 2004 Romania exhibited one of the largest world market share in machine tools (5.3%). Romanian-based companies such as Dacia, Petrom, Rompetrol, Bitdefender, Romstal and Mobexpert have expanded operations throughout the region. However, small- to medium-sized manufacturing firms form the bulk of Romania's industrial sector.

Industrial output growth was 6.9% year-on-year in December 2009, making it the highest in the EU-27 zone which averaged −1.9%.

Romania has the third-highest percentage of women working in information and communications technologies (ICT) in Europe. 29% of their workforce is made up of women.

=== Services ===
In 2003 the service sector constituted 55% of gross domestic product (GDP), and employed 51.3% of the workforce. The subcomponents of services are financial, renting, and business activities (20.5%); trade, hotels and restaurants, and transport (18%); and other service activities (21.7%). The service sector in Romania has expanded in recent years, employing some 47% of Romanians and accounting for slightly more than half of GDP.

The largest employer is the retail sector, employing almost 12% of Romanians. The retail industry is mainly concentrated in a relatively small number of chain stores clustered together in shopping malls. In recent years the rise of big-box stores, such as Cora (hypermarket) (of France) and Carrefour (a French subsidiary), have led to fewer workers in this sector and a migration of retail jobs to the suburbs.

== Biotechnology industry ==
Romania has been investing in its biotechnology sector, reportedly investing hundred of millions of dollars towards building up infrastructure, research and development, and the recruitment of international scientists. Romania features competitive bio-industries in key areas as pharmacogenomics, protein engineering, glyco-engineering, tissue engineering, bio-informatics, genome medicine and preventive medicine. Romania is devoting resources to developing universities and R&D facilities, increasing biotech startups, growing bio-clusters (communities of biotechnology companies and institutions) and developing a skilled workforce in the sector.

== Regional variation ==
The strength of the Romanian economy varies from region to region. PPP, and GDP per capita is the highest in Bucharest. The following table shows the highest GDP per capita of the other 4 counties, with data supplied by CNP.

| Rank | County | GDP per capita (2022) (EUR) |
|---|---|---|
| 1 | Bucharest | 57,189 |
| 2 | Timiș | 29,996 |
| 3 | Constanța | 27,608 |
| 4 | Cluj | 25,682 |
| 5 | Brașov | 23,908 |
| 6 | Arad | 21,000 |

The highest GDP per capita is found in Bucharest and surrounding Ilfov County. Values well above the national average are found in Timiș, Argeș, Brașov, Cluj, Constanța, Arad, Sibiu and Prahova. Values well below the national average are found in: Vaslui, Botoșani, Călărași, Neamț, Vrancea, Suceava, Giurgiu, Mehedinți, Olt and Teleorman.

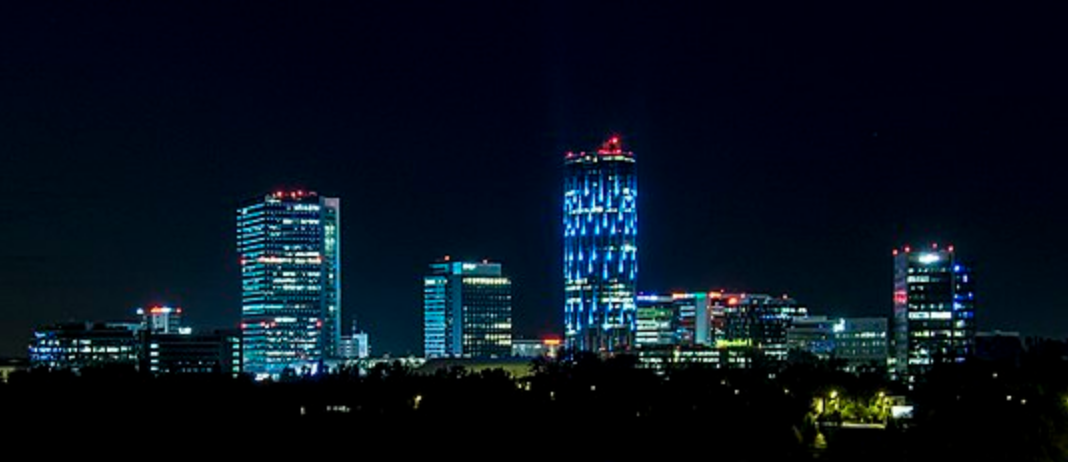
Skyscrapers in Bucharest

== Foreign trade ==
Exports of Romania by product category (2019) Chemical products Transportation Machines Mineral products Plastics and rubbers Metals Foodstuffs Precious metals Textiles Instruments Animal products Vegetable products Paper goods Footwear and headwear Miscellaneous Stone and glass Wood products Animal and vegetable bi-products Animal hides Arts and antiques Weapons

In 2017, Romania's largest trading partner was Germany, followed by Italy. Romania's main imports and exports are electrical machinery, motor vehicles & parts and industrial machinery. While Romania imports substantial quantities of grain, it is largely self-sufficient in other agricultural products and food stuffs, due to the fact that food must be regulated for sale in the Romania retail market, and hence imports almost no food products from other countries.

Romania imported in 2006 food products of 2.4 billion euros, up almost 20% versus 2005, when the imports were worth slightly more than 2 billion euros. The EU is Romania's main partner in the trade with agri-food products. The exports to this destination represent 64%, and the imports from the EU countries represent 54%. Other important partners are the CEFTA countries, Turkey, Republic of Moldova and the USA. Despite a decline of the arms industry in the post-communist era, Romania is a significant exporter of military equipment, accounting for 3–4% of the world total in 2007. EU members are represented by a single official at the World Trade Organization.

During the first trimester of 2010, Romanian exports increased by 21%, one of the largest rates in the European Union. The trade deficit stood at roughly 2 billion EUR, the eighth largest in the EU. The annual trade deficit has widened every year since 2014, standing at about EUR 18.77B in 2020.

== Miscellaneous data ==
Households with access to fixed and mobile telephone access

- landline telephone – 76% (2017)
- mobile telephone – 115% (2017)

Broadband penetration rate

- 79% (2019)

Individuals using computer and internet

- computer – 74% (2017)
- internet – 87% (2017)

== See also ==
- List of companies of Romania

General:

- Economy of Europe
