= BRD – Groupe Société Générale =

Romanian bank

BRD - Groupe Société Générale SA
- Type: Public
- Traded as: BVB: BRD
- Industry: Finance and Insurance
- Founded: 19 June 1923; 103 years ago
- Headquarters: Bucharest, Romania
- Products: Commercial banking, Investment banking, Private banking, Asset management
- Revenue: ▲RON 4.3 billion (2025)
- Net income: ▲RON 1.5 billion (2025)
- Total assets: ▲RON 98.04 billion (2025)
- Total equity: ▲RON 10.5 billion (2025)
- Owner: Société Générale (60.17%)
- Website: www.brd.ro

BRD - Groupe Société Générale SA is a Romanian bank which is based in Bucharest, Romania. It was founded in 1923 and is currently the third largest bank by assets (about 10.9 bn €) in Romania.

The majority of shares are owned by French Société Générale financial group who holds a stake of 60.17%. It was rebranded after the Société Générale acquired Banca Română pentru Dezvoltare (English: Romanian Development Bank) from the Romanian Government in 1999.

== History ==
=== Foundation ===
In 1923, Societatea Națională de Credit Industrial was founded as a public institution. The National Bank of Romania held the majority with 30% of the share capital.

After World War II and the Nationalization Law of June 1948, Societatea Națională de Credit Industrial was nationalized and became Banca de Credit pentru Investiții.

BRD was founded in 1990 as a commercial bank by taking over assets of the former Investment Bank of Romania.

Since 31 October 2012, the general manager of the BRD is Philippe Charles Lhotte. He replaced Alexandre Paul Maymat who stepped down due to family reasons.

In July 2013, Moody's downgraded the BRD's ratings to Ba2/Not-Prime from Baa3/Prime-3, following the lowering of the bank's baseline credit assessment (BCA) to b2 from ba3.

== Controversies and legal issues ==
In December 2012, the Romanian authorities opened an investigation on a $111 million fraud at BRD.

In May 2015, the Romanian authorities opened an investigation on a €43 million fraud involving Remus Truică.

== Activity ==
It has over 2.2 million clients, more than 900 branches and recently moved its headquarters into a new building on Victoriei Square in the north side of Bucharest, into one of the tallest towers in the country as of 2005.

Piaţa Unirii branch in Bucharest

Stăpungerii Silvestru branch in Iaşi

== See also ==
- List of banks in Romania
