= Capitalization-weighted index =

Stock market index whose components are weighted by total market value

A capitalization-weighted (or cap-weighted) index, also called a market-value-weighted index is a stock market index whose components are weighted according to the total market value of their outstanding shares. Every day an individual stock's price changes and thereby changes a stock index's value. The impact that individual stock's price change has on the index is proportional to the company's overall market value (the share price multiplied by the number of outstanding shares), in a capitalization-weighted index. In other types of indices, different ratios are used.

For example, the NYSE Amex Composite Index (XAX) is composed of all of the securities traded on the exchange including stocks and American depositary receipts (ADRs). The weighting of each component shifts with changes to each securities' price and the number of shares outstanding. The index moves in line with changes in price of the component.

Stock market indices are a type of economic index.

== Free-float weighting ==
A common version of capitalization weighting is the free-float or public-float weighting. With this method a float factor is assigned to each stock to account for the proportion of outstanding shares that are held by the general public, as opposed to "closely held" shares owned by the government, royalty, or company insiders. For example, if 15% of shares of a stock are closely held, and the other 85% are publicly held, the float factor will be 0.85, by which the company's market capitalization will be multiplied before weighting its value against the rest of the index. In other words, the number of shares used for calculation is the number of shares "floating", rather than outstanding.

An index that is weighted in this manner is said to be "float-adjusted" or "float-weighted" in addition to being cap-weighted. For example, the S&P 500 index is both cap-weighted and float-adjusted.

Historically, in the United States, capitalization-weighted indices tended to use full weighting, i.e., all outstanding shares were included, while float-weighted indexing has been the norm in other countries, possibly because of large cross-holdings or government ownership. More recently, many of the U.S. indices, such as the S&P 500, have been changed to a float-adjusted weighting which makes their calculation more consistent with non-U.S. indices.

== Other types of indices ==
An index may also be classified according to the method used to determine its price. In a price-weighted index such as the Dow Jones Industrial Average, the price of each component stock is the only consideration when determining the value of the index. Thus, price movement of even a single security will heavily influence the value of the index even though the dollar shift is less significant in a relatively high-value name. In a fundamentally weighted index, stocks are weighted by fundamental factors like sales or book value.

== Notable capitalization-weighted indices ==
- CAC 40
- CNX Nifty
- Bovespa Index
- DAX
- EURO STOXX 50
- FTSE 100 Index
- FTSE techMARK 100
- Hang Seng Index
- IBEX 35
- Indice de Precios y Cotizaciones (IPC)
- KOSPI
- KOSDAQ
- KSE 100 Index
- Kuala Lumpur Composite Index (KLCI)
- MSCI EAFE
- NASDAQ-100
- NASDAQ Composite
- NYSE Composite
- RTS Index
- Russell 2000
- SENSEX
- S&P 500
- S&P/ASX 200
- Standard & Poor's 100 Index (OEX)
- Taiwan Capitalization Weighted Stock Index
- TOPIX
- VN-Index

== See also ==
- Stock market index
- Index (economics)
- Index fund
- Index investing
- List of stock market indices
- Fundamental weighting
