= List of stock market indices =

Notable stock market indices include:

== Global ==
Large companies not ordered by any nation or type of business:

- Dow Jones Global Titans 50
- FTSE All-World
- MSCI World – Developed, mid-cap and large-cap stocks only
- OTCM QX ADR 30 Index
- S&P Global 100
- S&P Global 1200
- The Global Dow – Global version of the Dow Jones Industrial Average

== Regional ==
- MSCI EAFE – Europe, Australasia, and Far East
- East Africa Exchanges 20 Share Index – East Africa

=== Asia ===
- S&P Asia 50

=== Europe ===
- EURO STOXX 50 – 50 large blue chip companies in the Eurozone
- STOXX Europe 600
- S&P Europe 350
- UBS 100 Index – the 100 Swiss companies with the largest market capitalizations that are listed on the SIX Swiss stock exchange.

=== Latin America ===
- S&P Latin America 40

== National ==
Equity indices ordered by nationality of companies (in alphabetical order).

=== Africa ===
==== Botswana ====
- BSE DCI – Botswana Stock Exchange Domestic Company Index

==== Egypt ====
- EGX 30 Index

==== Ghana ====
- GSE Composite Index

==== Morocco ====
- MASI index (Moroccan All Shares Index)
- MADEX index (Moroccan Most Active shares Index)

==== South Africa ====
- FTSE/JSE Top 40 Index
- FTSE/JSE All Share Index

==== Tanzania ====
- Tanzania All Share Index

==== Zimbabwe ====
- Zimbabwe Industrial Index

=== Americas ===
==== Argentina ====
- MERVAL – 12 Companies

==== Brazil ====
- Índice Bovespa – Bovespa Index

==== Canada ====
- S&P/TSX 60
- S&P/TSX Composite Index
- S&P/TSX Venture Composite Index

==== Chile ====
- IPSA

==== Colombia ====
- Indice General de la Bolsa de Valores de Colombia
- COLCAP

==== Mexico ====
- Indice de Precios y Cotizaciones (IPC) ("Bolsa index")

==== Peru ====
- S&P/BVL Peru General Index

==== United States ====
- Amex indices
  - NYSE Arca Major Market Index
- CBOE indices
  - CBOE S&P 500 BuyWrite Index (BXM)
  - CBOE Volatility Index (VIX)
- Dow Jones & Company indices
  - Dow Jones Industrial Average
  - Dow Jones Transportation Average
  - Dow Jones Utility Average
- MarketGrader indices
  - Barron's 400 Index
- Nasdaq indices
  - Nasdaq Composite
  - Nasdaq-100
  - Nasdaq Financial-100
- Russell Indexes (published by Russell Investment Group)
  - Russell 3000
  - Russell 1000
  - Russell Top 200
  - Russell MidCap
  - Russell 2500
  - Russell Small Cap Completeness
- Standard & Poor's indices
  - S&P 100
  - S&P 500 (GSPC, INX, SPX)
  - S&P MidCap 400
  - S&P SmallCap 600
  - S&P 1500
- Value Line Composite Index
- Wilshire Associates indices
  - Wilshire 5000
  - Wilshire 4500

==== Venezuela ====
- Índice Bursátil de Capitalización (IBC)

=== Asia ===
==== China ====
- SSE Composite Index (上证综指)
- SZSE Component Index (深证成指)
- CSI 300 Index (沪深300指数)
- SSE 50 Index (上证50指数)
- SSE 180 Index (上证180指数)
- SZSE 100 Index (深证100指数)
- SZSE 200 Index (深证200指数)
- SZSE 300 Index (深证300指数)
- CSI 100 Index (中证100指数)

===== Hong Kong =====
- Hang Seng Index
- Hang Seng Composite Index Series
- MSCI Hong Kong Index

==== India ====
- BSE SENSEX
- NIFTY 50
- NIFTY Next 50
- NIFTY 500
- GIFT Nifty

==== Indonesia ====
- IDX Composite
- LQ45
- Jakarta Islamic Index (JII)

==== Israel ====
- TA-125 Index (Tel Aviv 125)
- TA-35 Index TASE's flagship index, listing TASE's 35 largest stocks by market cap, previously called the Ma'of.
- TA-90 – Stocks on TA-125 which are not included in TA-35

==== Japan ====
- Nikkei 225
- TOPIX

==== Jordan ====
- ASE Market Capitalization Weighted Index

==== Malaysia ====
- FTSE Bursa Malaysia Index
- FTSE Bursa Malaysia KLCI

==== Pakistan ====
- KSE 100 Index
- KSE 30 Index
- KMI 30 Index

==== Philippines ====
- PSE Composite Index (PSEi)
- PSE All Shares Index
- PSE Financials Index
- PSE Mining and Oil Index

==== Saudi Arabia ====
- Tadawul All-Share Index

==== Singapore ====
- Straits Times Index (STI)

==== South Korea ====
- KOSPI

==== Sri Lanka ====
- All Share Price Index (ASPI) – Started on 2 January 1985 on full market cap weight basis but changed to float adjusted market cap weight basis w.e.f. 22 January 2022.
- Milanka Price Index (MPI) – Started in 1999 Discontinuted w.e.f January 1, 2013.
- S&P Sri Lanka 20 Index – Started on 27 June 2012, this replaced Milanka Index
- Colombo Stock Exchange Sector indices (CSE Sectors) – Discontinuted with effect from January 1, 2016.
- S&P/CSE GICS Sector Indices (GICS Sectors).
- S&P/CSE GICS Industry Group Indices (GICS Industry Groups).

==== Taiwan ====
- TAIEX

==== Thailand ====
- SET Index
- SET50 Index and SET100 Index

==== Turkey ====
- BIST 100

==== Vietnam ====
- CBV Index
- S&P Vietnam 10 Index
- VN-Index

=== Europe ===
==== Austria ====
- ATX

==== Belgium ====
- BEL 20

==== Bosnia and Herzegovina ====
- BIRS – main market index in Republic of Srpska
- FIRS – investment funds index in Republic of Srpska
- ERS10 – power utility index in Republic of Srpska

==== Bulgaria ====
- SOFIX

==== Croatia ====
- CROBEX

==== Czechia ====
- PX Index

==== Denmark ====
- OMX Copenhagen 25

==== Finland ====
- OMX Helsinki 25 (OMXH25)

==== France ====
- CAC 40
- CAC Next 20
- CAC Mid 60
- CAC Small
- SBF 120
- CAC All-Tradable

==== Germany ====
- DAX – 40 companies weighted by the market cap
- MDAX – Mid cap
- SDAX – Small cap
- TecDAX

==== Greece ====
- FTSE/Athex Large Cap

==== Hungary ====
- BUX – Large cap
- BUMIX – Mid cap
- Central European Blue Chip Index – Regional large cap

==== Iceland ====
- OMX Iceland 15 (discontinued)
- OMX Iceland 8

==== Ireland ====
- ISEQ 20

==== Italy ====
- FTSE MIB
- FTSE Italia Mid Cap

==== Lithuania ====
- Nasdaq Vilnius (OMXVGI)

==== Luxembourg ====
- LuxX Index – Luxembourg Stock Exchange

==== Netherlands ====
- AEX index
- AMX index – Mid cap
- AScX index – Small cap

==== Norway ====
- OBX Index

==== Poland ====
- WIG
- WIG20
- WIG30

==== Portugal ====
- PSI-20

==== Romania ====
- BET
- BET-TR
- BET-XT
- ROTX
- MSCI Romania

==== Russia ====
- RTS Index (RTSI)

==== Serbia ====
- BELEX15
- BELEXline

==== Spain ====
- IBEX 35
- Madrid Stock Exchange General Index

==== Sweden ====
- OMX Stockholm 30 (OMXS30)
- OMX Stockholm PI (OMXSPI)

==== Switzerland ====
- SMI MID
- SMI Expanded
- Swiss Leader Index (SLI)
- Swiss Market Index (SMI)
- Swiss Performance Index (SPI)

==== Ukraine ====
- PFTS index

==== United Kingdom ====
- FT 30
- FTSE 100 Index
- FTSE MID 250 Index
- FTSE 350 Index
- FTSE AIM All-Share Index
- FTSE AIM UK 50 Index
- FTSE All-Share Index
- FTSE Fledgling Index
- FTSE SmallCap Index
- FTSE techMARK 100

=== Oceania ===
==== Australia ====
- All Ordinaries
- S&P/ASX 20
- S&P/ASX 50
- S&P/ASX 200
- S&P/ASX 300

==== New Zealand ====
- S&P/NZX 50

== Industry ==
Stock market indices covering specific industries include (in alphabetical order):

=== Energy ===
- Amex Oil Index (companies nationality: international)

=== Electronics ===
Electronic tech, computers, hardware, software, services, Internet

- PHLX Semiconductor Sector (companies nationality: international)
- TecDax Price Index

==== Metals ====
- HUI Gold Index
- Philadelphia Gold and Silver Index

=== Real Estate ===
- CBV Real Estate Index

=== Water ===
- Palisades Water Index (ZWI)

== See also ==
- Capital Markets Index
- List of stock exchanges
- List of African stock exchanges
- List of American stock exchanges
- List of East Asian stock exchanges
- List of European stock exchanges
- List of South Asian stock exchanges
- List of countries by stock market capitalization
