= ResMed =

Medical equipment company

ResMed Inc.
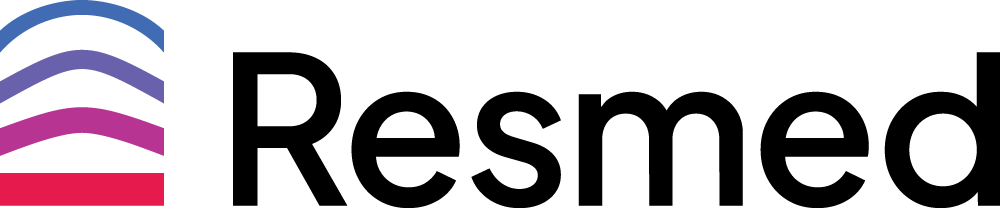
- Type: Public
- Traded as: NYSE: RMD; S&P 500 component; ASX: RMD; S&P/ASX 50 component
- Industry: Medical
- Founded: June 1989; 37 years ago in Australia
- Founder: Peter C. Farrell
- Headquarters: San Diego, California, U.S.
- Key people: Michael "Mick" Farrell (CEO); Aaron Bloomer (CFO); Justin Leong (CPO); Michael Rider(CLO); Katrin Pucknat (CMO); Mike Fliss (CRO)
- Products: Medical equipment for sleep-disordered breathing and other respiratory disorders
- Revenue: ▲US$5.15 billion (2025)
- Operating income: ▲US$1.69 billion (2025)
- Net income: ▲US$1.40 billion (2025)
- Total assets: ▲US$8.17 billion (2025)
- Total equity: ▲US$5.97 billion (2025)
- Number of employees: 10,600 (2025)
- Website: resmed.com
- Footnotes; Financials as of June 30, 2025.

Resmed Inc. is a medical equipment company based in San Diego, California, and founded in Australia. It primarily provides cloud-connectable medical devices for the treatment of sleep apnea (such as CPAP devices and masks), chronic obstructive pulmonary disease (COPD), and other respiratory conditions. Resmed produced hundreds of thousands of ventilators and bilevel devices to help treat the respiratory symptoms of patients with COVID-19. Resmed also provides software to out-of-hospital care agencies to streamline transitions of care into and between these care settings for seniors and their care providers (i.e. home health, hospice, skilled nursing facilities, life plan communities, senior living centers, and private duty).

Resmed employs more than 8,000 people worldwide as of June 2022. The company operates in more than 140 countries worldwide, and has manufacturing facilities in Australia, Singapore, France, and the United States. Revenue was US$4.7 billion in fiscal year 2024.

== History ==
Resmed was established in June 1989 by Peter Farrell in Australia. The company opened an office in San Diego in 1992, and made that its headquarters two years later when it incorporated in the US.

== Leadership ==
On March 1, 2013, Peter's son Mick Farrell became the company's new CEO. Peter transitioned to a non-executive role at the end of the year.

In November 2023, there were many changes to the executive team at Resmed. Rob Douglas stepped down as the chief operating officer and president after announcing he would retire in January 2024. In the same month, it was announced that Justin Leong would serve as the chief product officer. Leong will also take over the digital health technology team. Katrin Pucknat will serve as the new chief marketing officer and Mike Fliss will serve as the new chief revenue officer.

== False claims settlement ==
In January 2020, Resmed Inc. agreed to pay more than $37.5 million to resolve alleged kickbacks paid to durable medical equipment suppliers, sleep labs, and other healthcare providers in violation of the Anti-Kickback Statute.
