= XMI =

XMI may refer to:

- Masasi Airport (IATA airport code XMI)
- Xinmi (geocode XMI), Zhengzhou, Henan, China; see List of administrative divisions of Henan
- Miarrã language (ISO 639:xmi language code)
- XML Metadata Interchange, a standard for exchanging metadata information
- XMI, an ETF operated by Blackrock on the TSX; see List of Canadian exchange-traded funds
- XMI (stock index), the AMEX Major Market Index
- XM (album) (aka XMI or XM 1), 2003, the first XM album by Porcupine Tree

== See also ==
- XMII (aka XM 2), 2005, the second XM album by Porcupine Tree
- XM1 (disambiguation)
- XML (disambiguation)
