= RMCC =

RMCC may refer to:

- Royal Military College of Canada
- Rich Mountain Community College, Mena, Arkansas, United States
- Russell Midcap Index (ticker symbol: ^RMCC)

== See also ==
- QBE Shootout, team golf event on the PGA tour, founded as the RMCC Invitational in 1989
- Resident magistrate's court case (abbreviated RMCC in legal citations)
