= East Africa Exchanges 20 Share Index =

The East Africa Exchanges (EAE) 20 Share Index is the first integrated stock index for the East African region. It was officially launched in April 2025 by the East African Securities Exchanges Association (EASEA) to boost regional capital market integration. The Index consists of the 20 leading listed companies from Kenya, Uganda, Tanzania, and Rwanda, with five companies from each country, accounting for over 85% of regional market capitalization.

== Composition ==
As of January 2026, the following companies were part of the index:

Company	Country	Sector
Safaricom Plc	Kenya	Telecommunications
KCB Group Limited	Kenya	Banking
Equity Group Holdings Plc	Kenya	Banking
Co-operative Bank of Kenya	Kenya	Banking
Absa Bank Kenya Plc	Kenya	Banking
CRDB Bank	Tanzania	Banking
NMB Bank	Tanzania	Banking
Tanzania Breweries Limited	Tanzania	Consumer goods
Tanga Cement Company Limited	Tanzania	Construction
Tanzania Cigarette Company	Tanzania	Consumer goods
BK Group Plc (Bank of Kigali)	Rwanda	Banking
Bralirwa Limited	Rwanda	Brewery
I&M Bank (Rwanda)	Rwanda	Banking
Cimerwa Cement Limited	Rwanda	Construction
MTN Rwandacell	Rwanda	Telecommunications
MTN Uganda Limited	Uganda	Telecommunications
Stanbic Uganda Holdings	Uganda	Banking
Bank of Baroda Uganda Limited	Uganda	Banking
Airtel Uganda Limited	Uganda	Telecommunications
Quality Chemical Industries Ltd	Uganda	Pharmaceuticals

== See also ==
- List of stock market indices
