= Banja Luka Stock Exchange =

Stock exchange located in Banja Luka

- Бањалучка берза Banjalučka berza
- Type: Stock Exchange
- Location: Banja Luka, Bosnia and Herzegovina
- Coordinates: 44°46′N 17°11′E
- Founded: 9 May 2001; 24 years ago
- Key people: Milan Božić (CEO)
- Currency: BAM
- Indices: BIRS; FIRS; ERS10
- Website: www.blberza.com

The Banja Luka Stock Exchange (BLSE; Serbian: Бањалучка берза, Banjalučka berza) is a stock exchange which operates in the city of Banja Luka in the Republika Srpska, Bosnia and Herzegovina. The Banja Luka Stock Exchange is a member of the Federation of Euro-Asian Stock Exchanges.

== History ==
In July 1998, the Republika Srpska passed the Law on Securities to create the capital markets. The following year the National Assembly of the Republic of Srpska appointed the first members of Republika Srpska Securities Commission newly created financial regulator and in 2001 the Central Registry of Securities (CRHoV) was established.

On 9 May 2001, Eight banks and one company trading in securities signed established the Banja Luka Stock Exchange, it obtained its license on the 9 August 2001. It obtained the electronic trading system (BTS) developed by the Ljubljana Stock Exchange (LJSE) in 2002 and on the 14 March 2002 the first trading session took place, involving six Members that traded 20 listed securities. Later that year it agreed to cooperate with the Ljubljana Stock Exchange and the Belgrade Stock Exchange.

In January 2003 the first session of The Listing Commission took place and stocks of 13 Privatisation Investment Funds were admitted to the official market. The first auction government bonds took place on the 20 August. A month later shares of the company Rafinerija ulja a.d. Modriča were listed on the official market being the first private company to listed on an official market in Bosnia.

In 2004 and 2005, three stock market indices were created, the Stock Exchange Index of Republic of Srpska (BIRS), Investment Funds Index of Republic of Srpska (FIRS) and the Index of the Power Utility Companies of Republic of Srpska (ERS10).

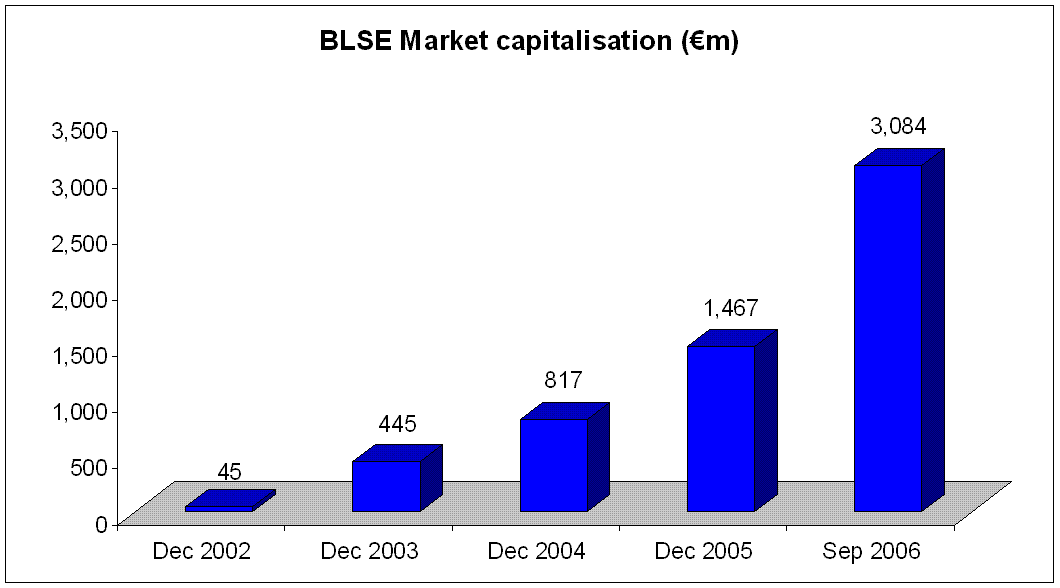
BLSE market capitalisation

== Official market ==
The official market is the main part of the stock exchange market, where, apart from the general conditions, there are also requirements of specific conditions regarding the amount of equity, class diversification in public, business performance and objectivity of financial statements. As the financial capital market of the Republika Srpska were still in its infancy most securities from privatisation process were listed on the free market.

General conditions for listing securities on organised market are:

- possibility to trade in an organised way with those securities
- securities have been paid in full
- freely transferable
- issued in non material form.

== Free market ==
The free market lists securities that meet all general conditions for listing. Securities are listed on the free market segment if required by the issuer or by the law. Shares from privatization process and publicly offered shares are listed on the free market after registration with the Central Registry of Securities.

As of 2003, the number of shares listed on this market segment was 630, according to the Stock Exchange Monitor, and it was expected to reach 830 after the registration of shares from privatization in the Central Registry of Securities has been completed.

== Indexes ==
- BIRS, an index of 12 leading shares on the stock exchange, including Telekom Srpske and Rafinerija ulja Modriča.
- FIRS, an index of 13 privatisation-investment funds in Republika Srpska.
- ERS10, index of the Power Utility Companies of Republic of Srpska.

== Clearing and settlement ==
The Central Registry of Securities for all members of the Central Registry takes on fulfillment of monetary liabilities and fulfillment of obligation to transfer securities arising from transactions concluded on the Stock Exchange or other regulated public market. This database has to include all securities traded on the BLSE. Transactions concluded on the BLSE are settled on T+3.

== Foreign investment regulation and taxation ==
A foreign investor has equal rights as a native investor concerning rights and liabilities and legal status in an enterprise. A foreign investor acquires the right on additional guaranties that are not granted to local persons since the Constitutions of the Republika Srpska prescribes that the right acquired by investment of capital shall not be reduced by the law or any other regulation and guarantees free expatriation of profit and of capital after the end of investment.

== Members ==
- Eurobroker a.d. Banja Luka
- Nova banka a.d. Banja Luka
- Raiffeisen capital a.d. Banja Luka
- Monet broker a.d. Banja Luka
- Advantis broker a.d. Banja Luka

== See also ==
- Republika Srpska Securities Commission
- List of stock exchanges
- List of European stock exchanges
- Sarajevo Stock Exchange
