= XM1 =

XM1 may refer to:

- 3730 Hurban (1983 XM1), a main-belt asteroid
- The Fujifilm X-M1, a mirrorless digital camera
- The M1 Abrams (or XM1 prototype), a US main battle tank
- The Marske XM-1, an experimental glider plane
- An Sirius XM Satellite Radio broadcast satellite, XM-1 "Rock"

== See also ==
- XM (disambiguation)
- XMI (disambiguation)
- XML (disambiguation)
