= Republika Srpska Securities Commission =

Financial services regulator in Republika Srpska, Bosnia and Herzegovina

- Комисија за хартије од вриједности Републике Српске; Komisija za hartije od vrijednosti Republike Srpske
- Type: Securities Commission
- Location: Banja Luka, Bosnia and Herzegovina
- Coordinates: 44°46′33.50″N 17°11′24.91″E
- Website: secrs.gov.ba

The Republika Srpska Securities Commission (Serbian: Комисија за хартије од вриједности Републике Српске or Komisija za hartije od vrijednosti Republike Srpske) is a financial services regulator in Republika Srpska, Bosnia and Herzegovina. It is based in the city of Banja Luka.

In Bosnia, the two political entities Republika Srpska and the Federation have each taken separate responsible for the regulation and development of capital markets within their own territories. In June 1998, the National Assembly of the Republika Srpska adopted the Securities Market Law which included the establishing of the Republika Srpska Securities Commission. The commissions jurisdiction is limited to the territory governed by the Republica Srpska within Bosnia and Herzegovina. The equivalent Federation agency, is the "Securities Commission of the Federation of Bosnia and Herzegovina" (Bosnian: Komisija za vrijednosne papire Federacije Bosne i Hercegovine).

== Objectives ==
The objectives if the commission are:

- supporting the establishment and development of a securities markets in the Republika Srpska
- the efficient functioning of a regulated, fair, open securities market in order to gain the confidence of all stakeholders
- protection of investors' and other market participants' interests.

== Roles and responsibilities ==
According to the Commission website, the commission is delegated, among others, the following authorities and powers:

- pass regulations on the Republika Srpska securities market operations
- prescribe the conditions, issuing method and trading of securities distributed through the public offer
- license and supervise investment funds, investment fund management companies and other participants in the securities market
- monitor compliance with rules for ordinary trading and fair competition in securities trade
- ensuring the efficient functioning of the securities market and the protection of investors' interests
- prescribe elements of mandatory disclosure to investors and the public
- suspend the issuance and trade of particular securities and undertake other activities in the case of manipulation during trade

== Organisation ==
The commission is composed of a President, Deputy President and three other Commissioners appointed by the National Assembly of the Republika Srpska on the proposal of the Republika Srpska Government. Commissioners are appointed for 5-year terms (most recent from 2005 to 2010).

== Laws and regulations ==
Since its formation, the commission has passes the following laws:

- Investment Funds Act (RS official gazette 92/06, published on 22 September 2006)
- Securities Market Law (RS official gazette 92/06, published on 22 September 2006)
- Law on takeovers (RS official gazette 64-II/02, published on 14 October 2002)
- Law on privatisation investment funds and privatisation fund companies (RS official gazette 67/05, published on 15 June 2000)

== Information technology ==
The commission had web presence since 2006, but it was until September 2007 that fully functional web site was operational. New web site features access to all public databases, such as information on all market participants (issuers, brokerage firms, investment funds, custody banks, brokers, investment/portfolio managers and investment advisers), issues of new shares), past and current mergers, and access to all laws, regulations, standards, manuals and decisions that have been passed by the commission.

In January 2009, Commission made available information system for electronic data gathering - EPI (Serbian: Elektronsko Prikupljanje Informacija), which is similar to United States Securities and Exchange Commission's EDGAR. In first phase, Commission is gathering reports in digital format from brokerage firms, custody banks, stock exchanges and central registry of securities, while in second phase, which is scheduled for mid-2009, Commission plans to unveil electronic data gathering system for investment funds and their management companies, as well as securities deposit banks. Last phase in development will include publishing all public reports and developing web interface for analysis of those information.

== See also ==
- Banja Luka Stock Exchange
- BIRS index
- FIRS (index)
- ERS10 index
- List of financial supervisory authorities by country
