= OTC Markets Group =

American financial services corporation

OTC Markets Group, Inc.
- Formerly: National Quotation Bureau (1913-2000); Pink Sheets LLC (2000-2008); Pink OTC Markets (2008-2010)
- Type: Public
- Traded as: OTCQX: OTCM
- Industry: Financial services
- Founded: 1913; 113 years ago (as National Quotation Bureau)
- Headquarters: 300 Vesey Street, New York City, U.S.
- Key people: R. Cromwell Coulson (president, CEO and director)
- Revenue: ▲US$ 105.1 million (2022)
- Operating income: ▲US$ 36.8 million (2022)
- Net income: ▲US$ 30.8 million (2022)
- Total assets: ▲US$ 89.6 million (2022)
- Total equity: ▲US$ 29.8 million (2022)
- Divisions: OTC Link ATS, Market Data Licensing, Corporate Services
- Website: otcmarkets.com

OTC Markets Group, Inc. (formerly known as National Quotation Bureau, Pink Sheets, and Pink OTC Markets) is an American financial services corporation that operates a financial market providing price and liquidity information for almost 12,400 over-the-counter (OTC) securities. The group has its headquarters in New York City. OTC-traded securities are organized into four markets to inform investors of opportunities and risks: OTCQX, OTCQB, OTCID, and Pink Limited.

== History ==
The company was first established in 1913 as the National Quotation Bureau (NQB). For decades, the NQB reported quotations for both stocks and bonds, publishing the quotations in the paper-based Pink Sheets and Yellow Sheets respectively. The publications were named for the color of paper on which they were printed. NQB was owned by CCH from 1963 to 1993. In September 1999, the NQB introduced the real-time Electronic Quotation Service.

The National Quotation Bureau changed its name to Pink Sheets LLC in 2000 and subsequently to Pink OTC Markets in 2008. The company eventually changed to its current name, OTC Markets Group, in 2010. In July 2025, the company launched the OTCID market to replace the Pink Current tier, establishing new disclosure baselines for issuers. Currently, a network of 89 broker-dealers price and trade a wide spectrum of securities on the OTC Markets platform.

To be quoted on the platform, companies are not required to file with the SEC, although many choose to do so. A wide range of companies are quoted on OTC Markets, including firmly established foreign firms, mostly through American depositary receipts (ADRs). In addition, many closely held, extremely small and thinly traded U.S. companies have their primary trading on the OTC Markets platform.

Many foreign issuers adhere to the listing requirements of qualified foreign stock exchanges and make their home country disclosure available in English. There are also a significant number of U.S.-based issuers who are current in their reporting to regulators such as the U.S. Securities and Exchange Commission (SEC) or make available ongoing quarterly and audited annual financial reports through OTC Markets Group. Many companies in the lower market tiers of the OTC categorization system do not meet the United States' listing requirements for trading on a stock exchange such as the New York Stock Exchange or NASDAQ. Many of these issuers do not file periodic reports or make available audited financial statements, making it very difficult for investors to find reliable, unbiased information about those companies. For these reasons the SEC views many of the lower-tier companies traded on OTC Markets as "among the most risky investments" and advises potential investors to heavily research the companies in which they plan to invest.

Securities trading on the OTCQB and higher-tiered OTCQX trading marketplaces have status of Blue Sky secondary trading exemptions in 33 states and brokers may recommend such securities to their clients like securities listed on national stock exchanges.

== Markets ==
OTC Markets Group designates securities in one of four markets to indicate the level of financial and corporate disclosure provided by the companies using its quotation system. Apart from the OTCQX market, which has rules that include financial requirements, the designations do not signify issuer quality or merit of any security. Designation is based on the level and timeliness of a company's disclosure. Strict promotion policies have been enacted to flag these companies and deny their application for trading if they engage actively in campaigns marked by misleading information or manipulative promotions.

The OTCQX and OTCQB markets are considered 'Established Public Markets' by the SEC for the purpose of determining the public market price when registering securities for resale with the SEC in equity line financings. OTC Markets Group can facilitate electronic trading with its SEC-registered alternative trading system known as OTC Link ATS.

=== OTCQX ===
The OTCQX market includes both multinational companies seeking access to U.S. investors, and domestic growth companies. To be traded on this tier, companies must undergo a qualitative review by OTC Markets Group. Companies are not required to be registered with or reporting to the SEC, but they must post financial information with OTC Markets Group. In addition, U.S. companies must be ongoing operations (i.e., no shells) and may not be in bankruptcy, while foreign issuers must meet the requirements of qualified foreign exchanges. Additional oversight of OTCQX securities is provided by requiring every issuer to be sponsored by approved third-party investment banks or law firms, called OTCQX Sponsors.

There were 668 securities on the OTCQX market as of October 19, 2026, of which 179 of them are for companies based in the United States.

=== OTCQB ===
The OTCQB market contains a one penny ($0.01) bid price requirement "intended to remove companies that are most likely to be the subject of dilutive stock fraud schemes and promotions". Each company verifies via an annual OTCQB Certification, signed by the company CEO or CFO, that their company information is current, including information about a company's reporting status, company profile, information on management and boards, major shareholders, law firms, transfer agents, and IR / PR firms. Investor confidence improves when there is more information about a company's ownership structure, professional advisors and service providers. This certification will be required for any security newly qualified to be publicly quoted by a broker-dealer under SEC Rule 15c2-11, or when a Pink traded company becomes a current SEC reporting company, beginning May 1, 2014. International Reporting companies are also allowed to upgrade from Pink to OTCQB if they publish their 12g3-2(b) compliant disclosure online and verify their company profile. There is an annual fee for the OTCQB market of $12,000 per year and a one-time $2,500 application fee.

There were 1,166 securities on the OTCQB market as of October 19, 2026.

==== OTC QX/QB Blue Sky Status ====
As of November 2018, the OTCQX Market has Blue Sky status in 33 states and the OTCQB Market in 30 states. Blue sky laws are state regulations established as safeguards for investors against securities fraud. The laws, which may vary by state, typically require sellers of new issues to register their offerings and provide financial details. This allows investors to base their judgments on verifiable information. Since the SEC recognized OTCQX and OTCQB as established public markets, OTC Markets Group has worked collaboratively with state regulators since the 2014 JOBS ACT to apprise them of the easily accessible, free, public online disclosure of current information provided by companies traded on the OTCQX and OTCQB premium markets. As of April 2018, 60% of the 50 states now acknowledge the OTCQX Market for the purposes of secondary trading exemptions. The investor protection and quality control standards of the OTCQX and OTCQB therefore are of Status to meet or exceed the Blue Sky standards of the respective states.

=== OTCID ===
The OTCID (Over-the-counter Integrated Disclosure) market was launched in July 2025, replacing the Pink Current tier. It serves as a baseline market for companies that provide timely financial reporting, management certifications, and verified company profiles. The creation of the OTCCID market was intended to create a clearer distinction between companies that are actively engaged in their corporate disclosure and those that are not. Companies in this category must publish quarterly and annual reports and maintain updated disclosure to remain eligible; those that fail to meet these requirements are downgraded to the Pink Limited market.

There were 1,281 securities on the OTCID market as of October 19, 2026.

=== Pink Limited ===
The Pink Limited market (formerly the Pink market) includes companies that do not meet the disclosure requirements of the higher OTCID, OTCQB, or OTCQX tiers. This category includes companies that may have financial reporting problems, economic distress, or are in bankruptcy. It serves as a warning to investors that the securities have limited or no issuer involvement. Companies in this category may have submitted information no older than six months or made a filing on the SEC's EDGAR system in the previous six months, but are unwilling or unable to meet the stricter guidelines for the OTCID market.

There were 9,190 securities on the Pink Limited market as of October 19, 2026.

=== Expert Market ===
This market indicates companies that are unwilling or unable to provide disclosure to the public markets. Companies in this category do not make current information available via OTC Markets disclosure and news service, or if they do, the available information is older than six months. This category includes defunct companies that have ceased operations as well as "dark" companies with questionable management and market disclosure practices. Securities of publicly traded companies that are not willing to provide information to investors are considered highly risky. Quotations for stocks in this tier are hidden from the public. This tier was formerly known as the Pink No Information tier.

There were 3,731 securities in the Expert Market as of October 19, 2026.

=== Caveat Emptor ===
There is a public interest concern associated with the company designated as "Caveat Emptor" (Latin for "buyer beware"). This may include a spam campaign, stock promotion or known investigation of fraudulent activity committed by the company or through inside information. During a spam campaign, any stock that is not in the Current Information category will also have its quotes blocked on otcmarkets.com.

== Quotation eligibility ==
The SEC requires broker-dealers to comply with Exchange Act Rule 15c2-11 before displaying quotes on OTC securities, and requires submission of Form 211 to the FINRA OTC Compliance Unit. In 2019, amendments were proposed to 15c2-11, which had not been significantly amended since 1991.

FINRA Rule 6500 contains rules on quoting OTC securities on the OTCBB, but the OTCBB has diminished in importance and by 2016 less than 2% of OTC trades occurred on the OTCBB, as opposed to OTC Markets. In 2014, FINRA proposed to remove Rule 6500 and eliminate the OTCBB, but withdrew the rule and in 2016 proposed to update the OTCBB to provide a backup system in case quotation is disrupted or nonexistent.

Other FINRA rules such as Rule 6432 and Rule 5250 relate to the SEC Rule 15c2-11; for example, Rule 5250 prohibits market makers from receiving compensation from issuers.

== Risks and regulation ==
Many of the stocks traded OTC are microcap stocks, also known as penny stocks, which are known for fraudulent microcap stock fraud and penny stock scams.

After the passage of Sarbanes-Oxley Act in 2002, some companies delisted and became OTC to save costs and avoid certain regulations, although OTC companies have faced pressure to improve disclosure.

== Other OTC markets ==
=== OTCBB ===
The OTC Bulletin Board (OTCBB) was only a listing of securities that are also traded "over the counter" similar to the OTC Markets. The OTCBB has diminished in importance, with very little activity, but was previously retained as possible last resort system in case of disruption. OTCBB companies were required to file timely reports to a U.S. regulatory agency. Almost all OTCBB companies are now quoted via OTC Markets' OTC Link ATS because its fully electronic trading platform better meets the needs of automated broker-dealers. The OTCBB was shut down on November 8, 2021.

=== Grey market ===
Securities that are not listed on any stock exchange nor formally quoted on OTC Markets or OTCBB are considered to be in the grey market. Unsolicited transactions are processed independently and not centrally listed or quoted. Trades are reported to a self-regulatory organization (SRO), which then passes the data on to market data companies. The grey market is also called OTOTC or Other OTC.

There were 1,968 securities in the grey market as of October 19, 2026.

== Compliance Data Products ==
=== Compliance Analytics ===
The Compliance Analytics Product creates a security specific risk score for all OTCQX, OTCQB, OTCID, Pink Limited and Grey securities. Risk is assessed over 19 parameters including caveat emptor, shell status, penny stock status, price/volume changes and stock promotion data. Recently, the product integrated "Hot Sector" information about cannabis, cryptocurrency and blockchain.

=== Promotion Data ===
The Promotion Data Product provides market professionals and investors with active and historical promotion data for OTCQX, OTCQB, OTCID, Pink Limited and Grey securities.

== Index products ==
The company calculates and licenses indices of securities that trade on one of the top two market tiers, including the OTCM QX ADR 30 Index of OTCQX-traded American depository receipts
