= XML (disambiguation) =

XML, or Extensible Markup Language, is a markup language and file format.

XML or xml may also refer to:

- Explainable machine learning, a field in artificial intelligence
- Malaysian Sign Language (ISO 639 language code xml)
- Minlaton Airport (IATA airport code XML), serving Minlaton, South Australia; see List of airports in Australia
- Top Holiday Albums, a Billboard chart with the shortcut "XML"

== See also ==
- XMI (disambiguation)
- XM1 (disambiguation)
