= Iress =

Australian software company

Iress Limited
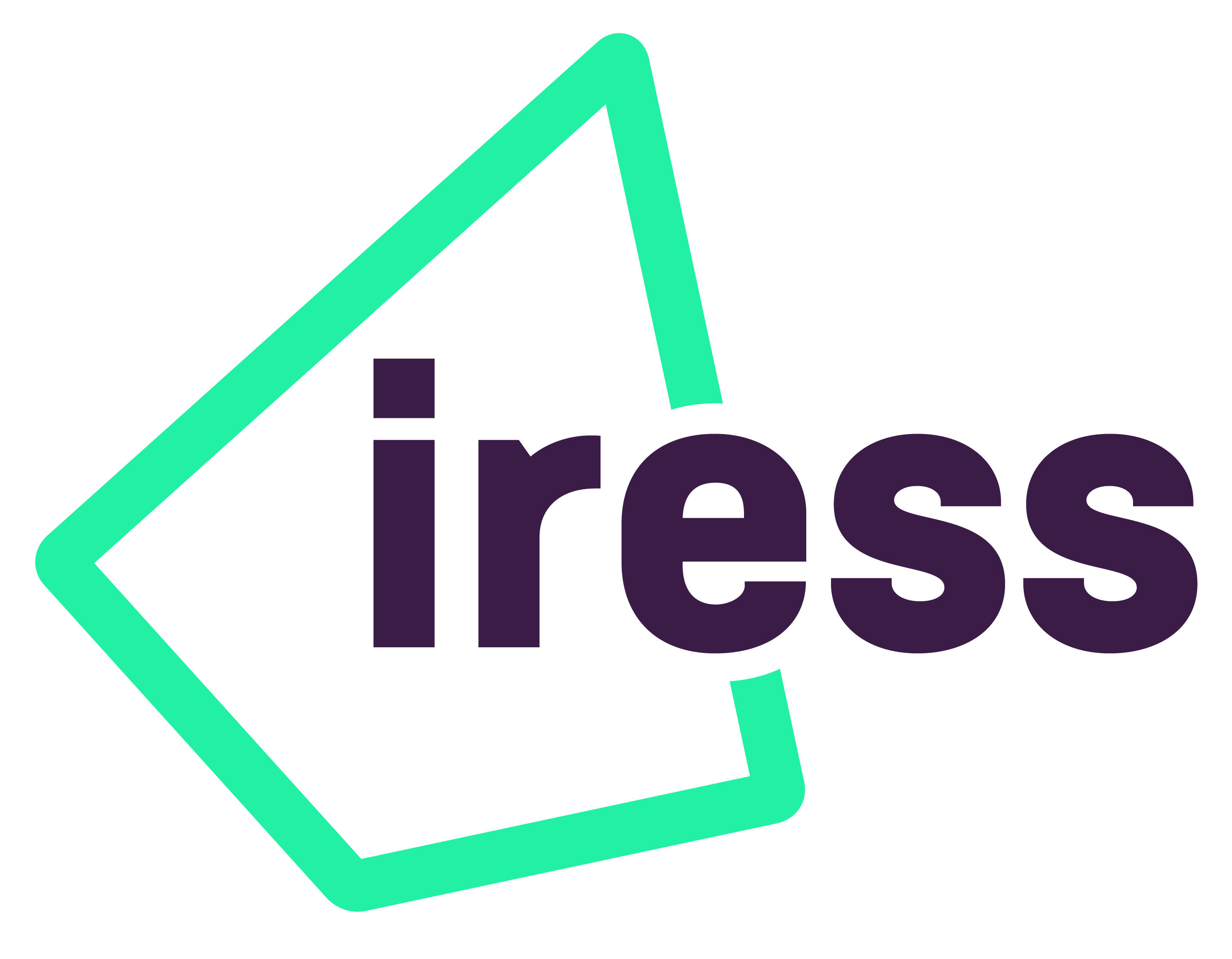
- Type: Public
- Traded as: ASX: IRE
- Industry: Software
- Founded: 1993
- Headquarters: Melbourne, Australia
- Key people: Roger Sharp (Chairman), Andrew Russell (Chief Executive Officer)
- Products: Trading platform, market data, wealth management software
- Revenue: A$: $542.6m(2020)
- Number of employees: 1,300 (2025)
- Website: iress.com

Iress is a technology company providing software to the financial services industry in Asia-Pacific, North America, Africa and UK & Europe. Iress software has more than 200 integrations and 300 data feeds, and is used by more than 500,000 users globally.

It is listed on the Australian Securities Exchange (ASX), and is a member of the S&P/ASX 200 index.

== History ==
Iress stands for Integrated Real-time Equity System. The company was formed in June 1993 as Dunai Financial Systems (DFS) by Peter Dunai, Neil Detering and Hung Do. Two years later the equity information software product ‘Iress’ was launched. In January 1997 Bridge Information Systems acquired 80% of Dunai Financial Systems (DFS) and formed BridgeDFS.

In June 1997 the trading software product ‘Iress Order System (IOS)’ was launched, in line with the ASX options market moving from floor to screen to commence electronic trading. In November 2000, BridgeDFS listed on the Australian Stock Exchange as BIS.ASX. and in October 2001, BridgeDFS changed its name to Iress Market Technology Limited (Iress).

Over the next decade, Iress expanded from a predominantly Australian operation, into a global technology business through a string of acquisitions. The company continued to evolve and expand to serve multiple client segments internationally. It faced a range of competitors, and its software services incorporated global technology trends and financial services regulatory influences.

=== Key acquisitions ===
- 2000: Listed on ASX
- 2003: Acquired Xplan (AU)
- 2004: Established Canadian JV (CA)
- 2006: Bought out Canadian JV (CA), Acquired Plantech (AU)
- 2007: Acquired Visiplan (AU), Acquired Spotlight (ZA)
- 2008: Acquired TransActive Systems (AU), Acquired DMS (AU)
- 2009: Acquired Fund Data (AU)
- 2010: Commenced operations in Asia, Acquired Sentryi (Asia)
- 2011: Commenced operations in the UK, Acquired Peresys (ZA)
- 2013: Acquired Avelo (UK)
- 2015: Acquired Innergi (AU), Acquired Proquote (UK), Acquired Pulse [10]
- 2016: Acquired Financial Synergy (AU) [12], Inet BFA (ZA)
- 2018: Acquired Pathway (AU)
- 2019: Acquired QuantHouse (FR)
- 2020: Acquired O&M Systems (UK), Acquired OneVue Holdings Limited (AU)

== Software ==
=== Financial Advice ===
- Xplan - Advice software platform including wealth solver, risk researcher, xtools and xtools plus
- CommPay - Revenue & remuneration management software
- O&M Profiler - Pensions and investments research and planning software.

=== Trading and Market Data ===
- Iress Order System - Trade order management software
- Pro - Market data & trading software
- Market Data - News, data & information service
- ViewPoint - Online trading & market data software
- QuantFeed - Low latency market data API for high-performance trading

=== Investment Management ===
- Execution Management System - Multi-asset, multi-market, global trading software
- Portfolio System - Portfolio management software
- O&M Profiler - Pensions and investments research and planning software.

=== Life and pensions ===
- The Exchange (UK) - Quote comparison & application software
- O&M Profiler - Pensions and investments research and planning software.

=== Superannuation ===
Automated Super Admin (AU) - digital offering that supports the day-to-day, back-office maintenance of superannuation funds

- Acurity Registry (AU) - Registry software for super funds
- Acurity Online (AU) - Online portal for members & employers

== Global Locations ==
=== Australia ===
- Melbourne: Level 16, 385 Bourke Street, Melbourne, Victoria 3000
- Sydney: Level 2, 1 Shelley Street, Sydney, New South Wales 2000
- Brisbane: Level 2, 307 Queen Street, Brisbane, Queensland 4000

=== United Kingdom ===
- London: 1 Tudor St, Blackfriars, London EC4Y 0AH
- Cheltenham: Honeybourne Place, Jessop Avenue, GL50 3SH

=== South Africa ===
- Johannesburg: Building Two, 2929 on Nicol, 2929 William Nicol Drive, Bryanston, Sandton
- Cape Town: 1st Floor, Sable Corner, Energy Lane, Century City, 7446

=== Canada ===
- Toronto: Bay Adelaide Centre, 333 Bay Street, Suite 720, PO Box 45, Toronto M5H 2R2

=== New Zealand ===
- Auckland: Level 20, SAP Tower, 151 Queen Street, Auckland, 1010, New Zealand

=== Singapore ===
- Singapore: 18 Robinson Road, #19-01, Singapore 048547

=== France ===
- Paris: 55 Rue d’Amsterdam, 75008 Paris

=== Tunisia ===
- Tunisia: Immeuble Regency VI, Bloc A, n°A2-03, n°A2-04 Les Jardins du Lac, 1053 Tunis

== Corporate affairs ==
=== Corporate social responsibility ===
==== Iress Foundation ====
Established in 2017, the Iress Foundation initiatives are driven and run by Iress people from around the world. The initiatives involve creating events and fundraising programs to support people in the local communities in Australia, South Africa, Canada and the UK.

Some of the Foundation's support partners include:

Iress Foundation Australia: Whitelion - providing support for at-risk young people, Two Good - supporting domestic violence survivors and soup kitchens by providing food and RURAL AID - Providing hands-on and holistic support to rural Australia.

Iress Foundation United Kingdom: Cobalt Health supports patients with cancer, dementia and other conditions and is focused on helping everyone get access to the best medical imaging for their diagnosis (www.cobalthealth.co.uk). The Grange Centre provides vital services supporting people with learning disabilities to lead independent and fulfilling lives (www.grangecentre.org.uk). Crisis is the UK national charity for homeless people, working directly with thousands of homeless people every year to provide vital help so that people can rebuild their lives and are supported out of homelessness for good. The Helping Hands Community Project gives people the support and opportunities they require to feel better about themselves, be more active in the community and get back into work.

Iress Foundation South Africa: Building an eco-system of coding skills and digital entrepreneurs in secondary schools to help build a new South African economy. Adopting the Healing Word Creche (Johannesburg) through Seeds of Africa, a community upliftment intervention. Contribute to training and resources for early childhood development (Durban).

Iress Foundation Canada: Supporting children and youth living with disability, medical complexity, illness and injury.

=== Environmental practices and initiatives ===
Since 2015, Iress has reported its energy use, air travel for all offices (and associated emissions for a number of offices), in addition to paper use as part of its risk reporting as recommended by the ASX Corporate Governance Principles and Recommendations (3rd ed.). Since January 2021, Iress’ offices in Sydney and Melbourne use 100% renewable energy. These offices contribute 95% of energy use across Australian operations.

== Management team ==
=== Board of Directors ===
Roger Sharp - Non-Executive Director and Chair

Trudy Vonhoff - Non-Executive Director

Anthony Glenning - Non-Executive Director

Robert Mactier - Non-Executive Director

Michael Dwyer AM - Non-Executive Director

Susan Forrester AM - Non-Executive Director

Andrew Russell - Managing Director and Chief Executive Officer

=== Executive Team ===
Andrew Russell - Chief Executive Officer

Cameron Williamson - Chief Financial Officer

Geoff Rogers - CEO - Trading & Market Data

Julia McNeill - Chief People Officer
