= BIRS =

Bosnian stock market index

The BIRS Index is a share index of the 12 largest companies listed on the Banja Luka Stock Exchange (BLSE), established on 1 May 2004. BIRS stands for Berzanski indeks Republike Srpske, which is Serbian for The Stock Exchange Index of Republika Srpska, an entity in Bosnia and Herzegovina.

The constituents of the index are determined semi-annually, on 15 May and 15 November. Component companies must meet a number of requirements set out by the BLSE. The highest value of the index to 22 September 2006, was on that day, at 2073.24.

Other indices on the Banja Luka Stock Exchange are the FIRS (an index of 13 privatisation-investment funds) and ERS10 (an index of 10 companies from the power utility sector).

As of 30 August 2006, the largest company by market capitalisation was Telekom Srpske a.d. Banja Luka, with the market cap of over BAM 1bn (€538m). All of the companies listed on this index include the abbreviation a.d. (akcionarsko drušvo) at the end of their name, indicating their status of a public limited company.

== List of BIRS companies ==
The following table lists the 12 BIRS companies according to their market capitalisation on 22 August 2006. At that date BAM1 was equivalent to USD0.66.

Rank	Company	Sector	Capitalisation in BAM	Capitalisation in Euros
1	Telekom Srpske a.d. Banja Luka	telecoms	1,061m	538m
2	Birač a.d. Zvornik	metals/mining	109m	56m
3	Rafinerija ulja a.d. Modriča	oil	101m	52m
4	NLB Razvojna banka a.d. Banja Luka	financial	95m	49m
5	Nova banka a.d. Bijeljina	financial	60m	31m
6	Banjalučka pivara a.d. Banja Luka	brewery	50m	26m
7	Boksit a.d. Milići	metals/mining	25m	13m
8	Tržnica a.d. Banja Luka	retail	21m	11m
9	Vitaminka a.d. Banja Luka	foods	14m	7m
10	Srpske pošte a.d. Banja Luka	post office	12m	6m
11	RK Boska a.d. Banja Luka	retail	6m	3m
12	Metal a.d. Gradiška	metal/mining	6m	3m

== Performance ==
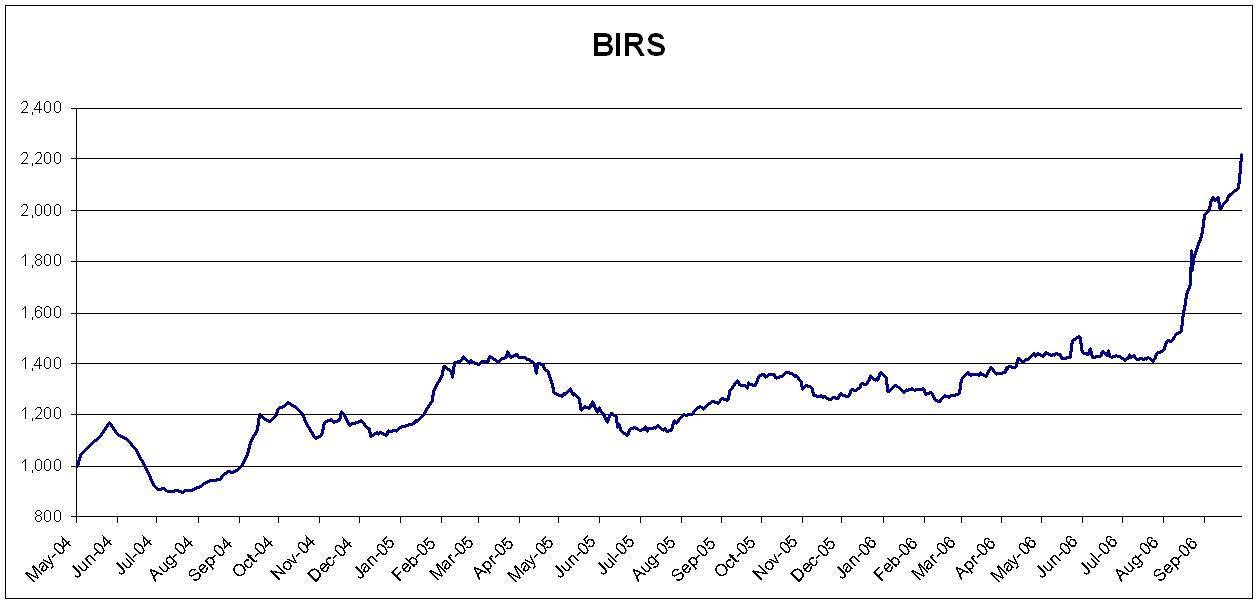
BIRS index movement

== See also ==
- Republika Srpska Securities Commission
