= Australian Securities Exchange =

Australian share market operator

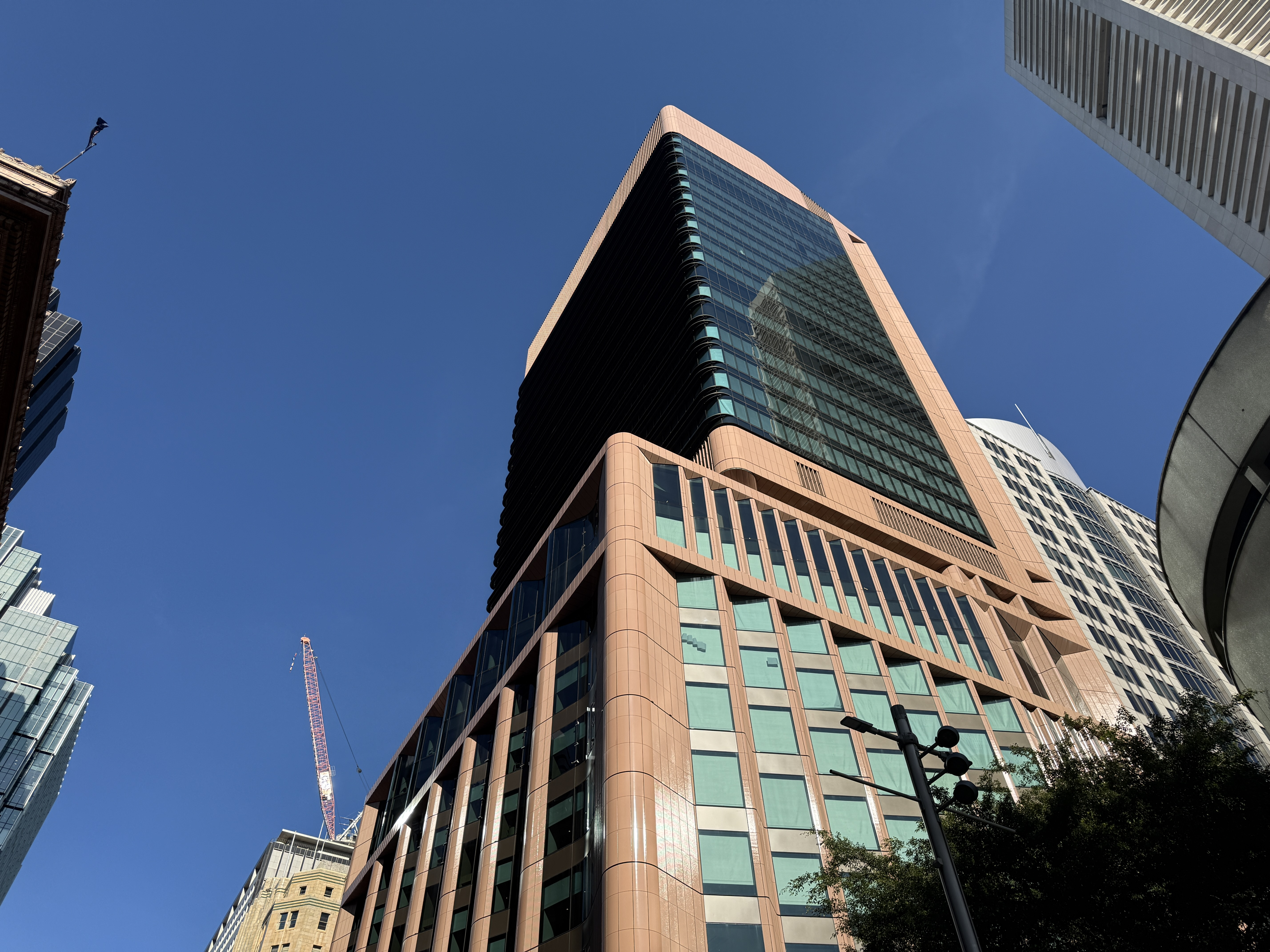
- ASX headquarters at 39 Martin Place, Sydney
- Type: Stock exchange, futures exchange, clearing house
- Location: Sydney, New South Wales, Australia
- Coordinates: 33.8680°S 151.2101°E
- Founded: 1 April 1987; 39 years ago
- Owner: ASX Limited; ASX: ASX
- Key people: Anthony Attia (CEO)
- Currency: Australian dollar
- No. of listings: 2,043 (June 2026)
- Market cap: A$3.2 trillion (June 2026)
- Indices: S&P/ASX 20; S&P/ASX 50; S&P/ASX 200; S&P/ASX 300; All Ordinaries
- Website: www.asx.com.au
- ASN: 18361

Australian Securities Exchange Ltd (ASX) is an Australian public company that operates Australia's primary securities exchange, the Australian Securities Exchange. The ASX was formed on 1 April 1987, through incorporation under legislation by the Parliament of Australia as an amalgamation of the six state securities exchanges. It merged with the Sydney Futures Exchange in 2006.

As of June 2026, the ASX had a total market capitalisation of about A$3.2 trillion, making it one of the world's top 20 listed exchange groups and the largest in the southern hemisphere.

ASX Clear is the clearing house for all shares, structured products, warrants and ASX Equity Derivatives.

== Overview ==
ASX Group is a market operator, clearing house and payments system facilitator. It also oversees compliance with its operating rules, promotes standards of corporate governance among Australia's listed companies and helps to educate retail investors.

Australia's capital markets

- Financial development – Australia was ranked 5th out of 57 of the world's leading financial systems and capital markets by the World Economic Forum;
- Equity market – the 8th largest in the world (based on free-float market capitalisation) and the 2nd largest in Asia-Pacific, with A$1.2 trillion market capitalisation and average daily secondary trading of over A$5 billion a day;
- Bond market – 3rd largest debt market in the Asia Pacific;
- Derivatives market – largest fixed income derivatives in the Asia-Pacific region;
- Foreign exchange market – the Australian foreign exchange market is the 7th largest in the world in terms of global turnover, while the Australian dollar is the 5th most traded currency and the AUD/USD the 4th most traded currency pair;
- Funds management – Due in large part to its compulsory superannuation system, Australia has the largest pool of funds under management in the Asia-Pacific region, and the 4th largest in the world. Its primary markets are the AQUA Markets.

Regulation

The Australian Securities & Investments Commission (ASIC) has responsibility for the supervision of real-time trading on Australia's domestic licensed financial markets and the supervision of the conduct by participants (including the relationship between participants and their clients) on those markets. ASIC also supervises ASX's own compliance as a public company with ASX Listing Rules.

ASX Compliance is an ASX subsidiary company that is responsible for monitoring and enforcing ASX-listed companies' compliance with the ASX operating rules.

The Reserve Bank of Australia (RBA) has oversight of the ASX's clearing and settlement facilities for financial system stability.

Products

Products and services available for trading on ASX include shares, futures, exchange traded options, warrants, contracts for difference, exchange-traded funds, real estate investment trusts, listed investment companies and interest rate securities.

The biggest stocks traded on the ASX, in terms of market capitalisation, include BHP, Commonwealth Bank, Westpac, Telstra, Rio Tinto, National Australia Bank and Australia & New Zealand Banking Group.

The major market index is the S&P/ASX 200, an index made up of the top 200 shares traded on the ASX. This supplanted the previously significant All Ordinaries index, which still runs parallel to the S&P ASX 200. Both are commonly quoted together, however the S&P ASX 200 is far more commonly used for investment purposes. Other indices for the bigger stocks are the S&P/ASX 100 and S&P/ASX 50.

== History ==
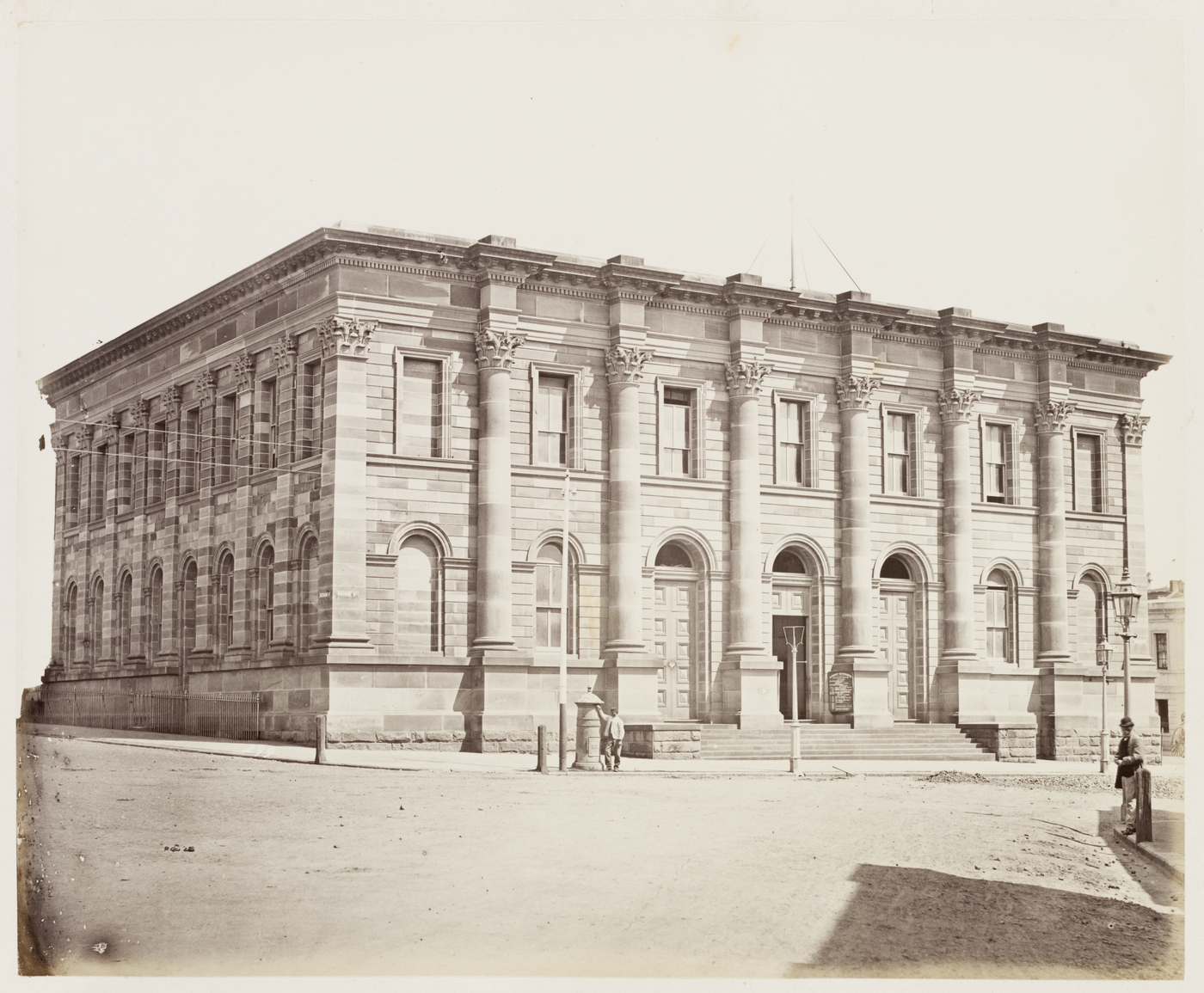
The Sydney Stock Exchange building in 1872

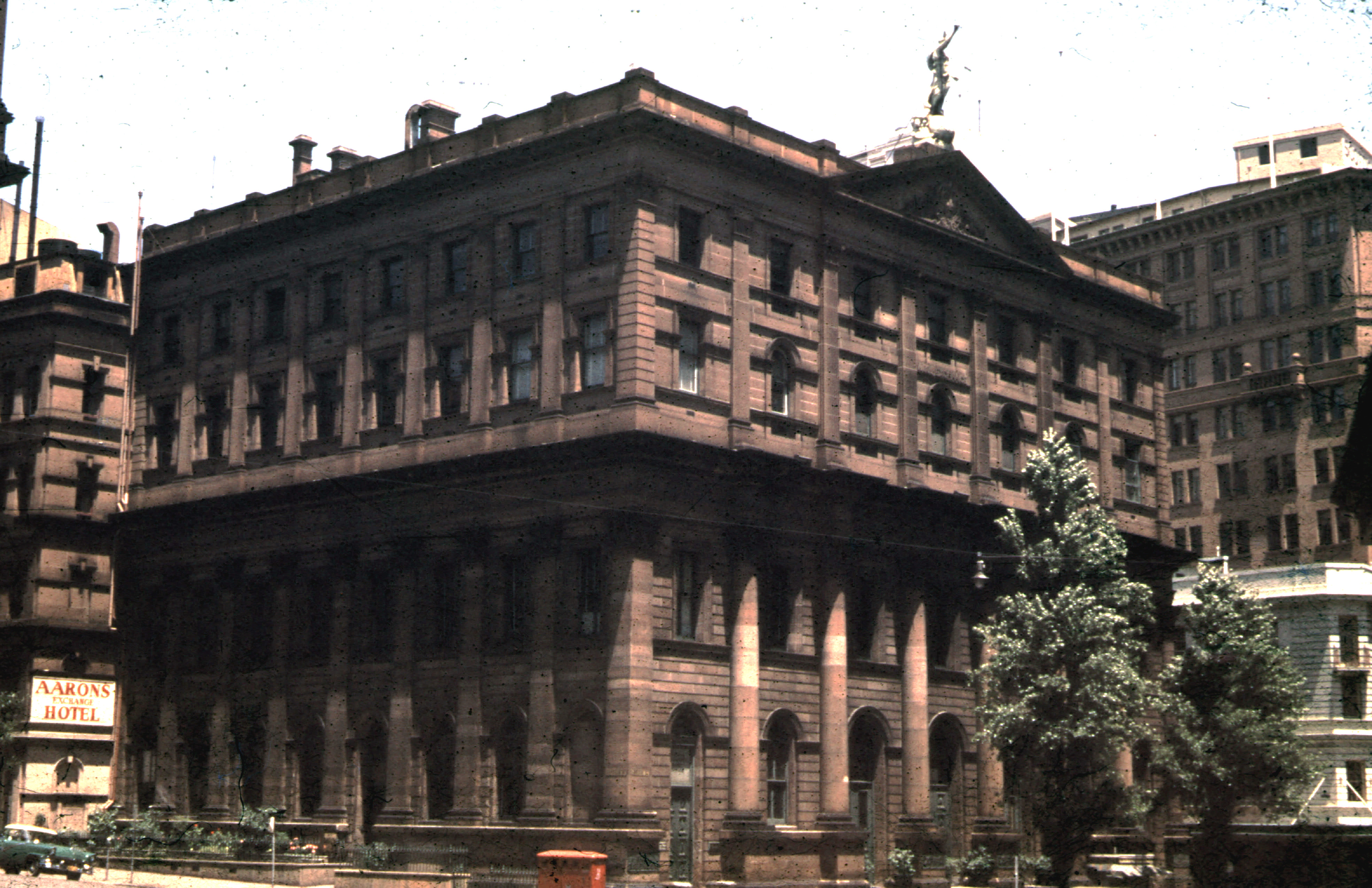
The Sydney Stock Exchange building in 1959

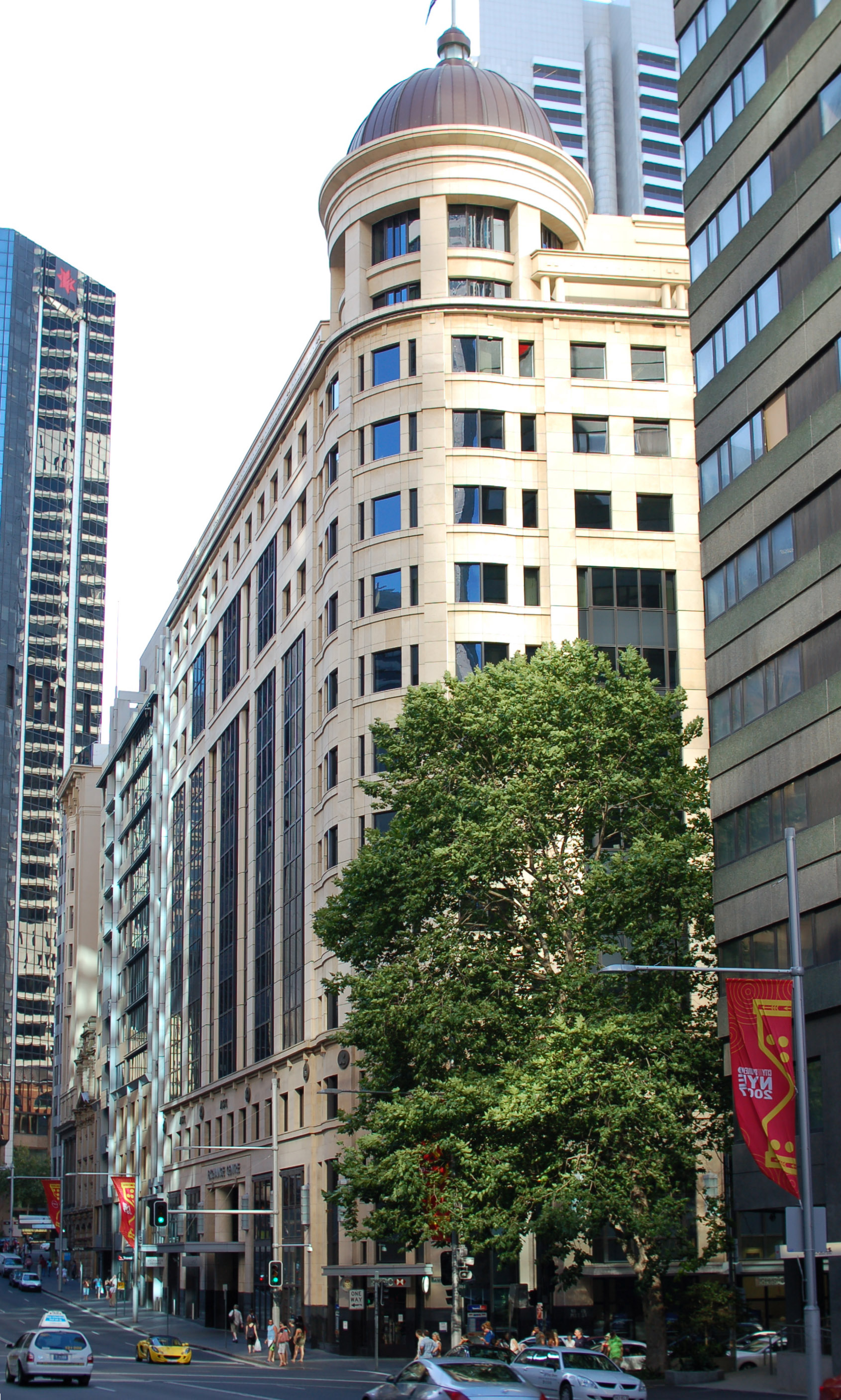
Exchange Square, 20 Bridge Street Sydney

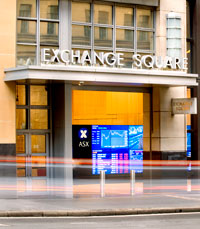
Exchange Square entrance

The origins of the ASX date back to the mid-1800s when six separate exchanges were established in Australia's state capital cities of Melbourne, Victoria, (1861), Sydney, New South Wales (1871), Hobart, Tasmania (1882), Brisbane, Queensland (1884), Adelaide, South Australia (1887) and Perth, Western Australia (1889, the Stock Exchange of Perth). A further exchange in Launceston, Tasmania, merged into the Hobart exchange.

In November 1903 the first interstate conference was held to coincide with the Melbourne Cup. The exchanges then met on an informal basis until 1937 when the Australian Associated Stock Exchanges (AASE) was established, with representatives from each exchange. Over time the AASE established uniform listing rules, broker rules, and commission rates.

Trading was conducted by a call system, where an exchange employee called the names of each company and brokers bid or offered on each. In the 1960s this changed to a post system. Exchange employees called "chalkies" wrote bids and offers in chalk on blackboards continuously, and recorded transactions made.

The ASX (Australian Stock Exchange Limited) was formed in 1987 by legislation of the Australian Parliament which enabled the amalgamation of six independent stock exchanges that formerly operated in the state capital cities. After demutualisation, the ASX was the first exchange in the world to have its shares quoted on its own market. The ASX was listed on 14 October 1998. On 7 July 2006 the Australian Stock Exchange merged with SFE Corporation, holding company for the Sydney Futures Exchange.

=== Timeline of significant events ===
1861: Ten years after the official advent of the Gold Rush, Australia's first stock exchange was formed in Melbourne. In the 1850s Victoria was Australia's gold mining centre, its population increasing from 80,000 in 1851 to 540,000 in 1861.

1871: Thirty years after it lit the first gas street light in Sydney, the Australian Gas Light Company took its place in history again, becoming the second company to list on the Sydney Stock Exchange.

1885: Two years after the Broken Hill Mining Company (private company) was established by a syndicate of seven men from the Mount Gipps Station, the company was incorporated to become the Broken Hill Proprietary Company Limited (BHP). In 1885, BHP listed on the Melbourne Stock Exchange.

1937: The Australian Associated Stock Exchanges (AASE) was established in 1937. Since 1903 the state stock exchanges had met on an informal basis, but in 1936 Sydney took the lead in formalising the association. Initially this involved the exchanges in Adelaide, Brisbane, Hobart and Sydney. Melbourne and Perth joined soon after. Through the AASE the exchanges gradually brought in common listing requirements for companies and uniform brokerage and other rules for stockbroking firms. They also set the ground rules for commissions and the flotation of government and semi-government loan raisings.

1938: Publication of the first share price index.

1939: Sydney Stock Exchange closed for the first time due to the declaration of World War II.

1960: Sydney Futures Exchange began trading as Sydney Greasy Wool Futures Exchange (SGWFE). Its original goal was to provide Australian wool traders with hedging facilities in their own country. SGWFE offered a single contract of greasy wool that by the end of the year had traded 19,042 lots.

1969–1970: The Poseidon bubble (a mining boom triggered by a nickel discovery in Western Australia) caused Australian mining shares to soar and then crash, prompting regulatory recommendations that ultimately led to Australia's national companies and securities legislation.

1976: The Australian Options Market was established, trading call options.

1980: The separate Melbourne and Sydney stock exchange indices were replaced by Australian Stock Exchange indices.

1984: Brokers' commission rates were deregulated. Commissions have gradually fallen ever since, with rates today as low as 0.12% or 0.05% from discount internet-based brokers.

1984: Sydney Stock Exchange closed due to heavy rain and flooding on 9 November 1984 with 70 millimetres of rain falling in one half-hour. All trading on the floor of the Sydney Exchange was suspended throughout Friday. Damage totaled $2 million and repairs took more than six months, with new carpet laid and cables and computers replaced.

Stockbrokers who had taken advantage of joint access were able to trade on the Melbourne Stock Exchange. And, with the Sydney trading floor closed by floodwaters, the Melbourne Exchange enjoyed its busiest trading day for the year. After that episode a back-up site was established outside the Sydney CBD.

1987: The Australian Stock Exchange Limited (ASX) was formed on 1 April 1987, through incorporation under legislation of the Australian Parliament. The formation of the national stock exchange involved the amalgamation of the six independent stock exchanges that had operated in the states' capital cities.

Launch of the Stock Exchange Automated Trading System (SEATS). It was a far cry from the original system which dated back over 100 years. During that time there had been three different forms of trading on the Australian stock exchanges. The earliest was the auction-based call system, which saw a stock exchange employee (the caller) call the name of each listed security in turn while members bid, offered, sold or bought the stock at each call. This system proved inadequate to handle the increased volume of trading during the mining booms. It was replaced by the 'post' system in the early 1960s, which involved stocks being quoted on 'posts' or 'boards'. 'Chalkies' were employed by the Stock Exchange and it was their function to record in chalk the bids and offers of the operators (employees of stockbrokers) and the sales made. This system stayed in place until 1987.

1990: A warrants market was established.

1993: Fixed-interest securities were added (see Interest rate market below). Also in 1993, the FAST system of accelerated settlement was established, and the following year the CHESS system (see Settlement below) was introduced, superseding FAST.

1994: The Sydney Futures Exchange announced trading in futures over individual ASX stocks. The ASX responded with the Low Exercise Price Option or LEPO (see below). The SFE went to court, claiming that LEPOs were futures and therefore that the ASX could not offer them. The court held they were options and so LEPOs were introduced in 1995.

1995: Stamp duty on share transactions was halved from 0.3% to 0.15%. The ASX had agreed with the Queensland State Government to locate staff in Brisbane in exchange for the stamp duty reduction there, and the other states followed suit so as not to lose brokerage business to Queensland. In 2000 stamp duty was abolished in all states as part of the introduction of the GST.

1996: The exchange members (brokers etc.) voted to demutualise. The exchange was incorporated as ASX Limited and in 1998 the company was listed on the ASX itself, with the Australian Securities & Investments Commission enforcing the listing rules for ASX Limited.

1997: Electronic trading commences as the option market moves from floor to screen. A phased transition to the electronic CLICK system for derivatives began.

1998: ASX demutualised to become a listed company. It was the first exchange in the world to demutualise and list on its own market, a trend that has been imitated by several other exchanges over the years. The Australian Mutual Provident Society began in 1849 as an organisation offering life insurance. Now known as AMP it became a publicly listed company on the ASX in 1998.

2000: In October, ASX acquires a 15% stake in the trading and order management software company IRESS (formerly BridgeDFS Ltd).

2001: Stamp duty on marketable securities abolished.

2006: The ASX announced a merger with the Sydney Futures Exchange, the primary derivatives exchange in Australia.

2010: The ASX was in merger talks with Singapore Exchange (SGX). While there was an initial expectation that the merger would have created a bourse with a market value of US$14 billion, this was a misconception; the final proposal intended that the ASX and SGX bourses would have continued functioning separately. The merger was blocked by Treasurer of Australia Wayne Swan on 8 April 2011, on advice from the Foreign Investment Review Board that the proposed merger was not in the best interests of Australia.

2025: The ASX prepared for a record number of four secondary listing from mine developers in the year, thanks to Australia's pension fund which greatly focused on domestic market, and the market's resilience to Trump-related uncertainties compared to Canada and UK.

2025: In 2025, the ASX relocated from 20 Bridge Street, Sydney, to 39 Martin Place, Sydney.

== Trading systems ==
ASX Group has two trading platforms – ASX Trade, which facilitates the trading of ASX equity securities and ASX Trade24 for derivative securities trading.

All ASX equity securities are traded on screen on ASX Trade. ASX Trade is a NASDAQ OMX ultra-low latency trading platform based on NASDAQ OMX's Genium INET system, which is used by many exchanges around the world. It is one of the fastest and most functional multi-asset trading platforms in the world, delivering latency down to ~250 microseconds.

ASX Trade24 is ASX global trading platform for derivatives. It is globally distributed with network access points (gateways) located in Chicago, New York, London, Hong Kong, Singapore, Sydney and Melbourne. It also allows for true 24-hour trading, and simultaneously maintains two active trading days which enables products to be opened for trading in the new trading day in one time zone while products are still trading under the previous day.

Opening times

The normal trading or business days of the ASX are week-days, Monday to Friday. ASX does not trade on national public holidays: New Year's Day (1 January), Australia Day (26 January, and observed on this day or the first business day after this date), Good Friday (that varies each year), Easter Monday, Anzac day (25 April), King's Birthday (June), Christmas Day (25 December) and Boxing Day (26 December).

On each trading day there is a pre-market session from 7:00 am to 10:00 am Sydney time and a normal trading session from 10:00 am to 4:00 pm Sydney time. The market opens alphabetically in Single-price auctions, phased over the first ten minutes, with a small random time built in to prevent exact prediction of the first trades. There is also a single-price auction between 4:10 pm and 4:12 pm to set the daily closing prices.

== Settlement ==
Security holders hold shares in one of two forms, both of which operate as uncertificated holdings, rather than through the issue of physical share certificates:

- Clearing House Electronic Sub-register System (CHESS). The investor's controlling participant (normally a broker) sponsors the client into CHESS. The security holder is given a "holder identification number" (HIN) and monthly statements are sent to the security holder from the CHESS system when there is a movement in their holding that month.
- Issuer-sponsored. The company's share register administers the security holder's holding and issues the investor with a security-holder reference number (SRN) which may be quoted when selling.

Holdings may be moved from issuer-sponsored to CHESS or between different brokers by electronic message initiated by the controlling participant.

== Short selling ==
Short selling of shares is permitted on the ASX, but only among designated stocks and with certain conditions:

- ASX trading participants (brokers) must report all daily gross short sales to ASX. The report will aggregate the gross short sales as reported by each trading participant at an individual stock level.
- ASX publishes aggregate gross short sales to ASX participants and the general public.

Many brokers do not offer short selling to small private investors. LEPOs can serve as an equivalent, while contracts for difference (CFDs) offered by third-party providers are another alternative.

In September 2008, ASIC suspended nearly all forms of short selling due to concerns about market stability during the 2008 financial crisis. The ban on covered short selling was lifted in May 2009.

Also, in the biggest change for ASX in 15 years, ASTC Settlement Rule 10.11.12 was introduced, which requires the broker to provide stocks when settlement is due, otherwise the broker must buy the stock on the market to cover the shortfall. The rule requires that if a Failed Settlement Shortfall exists on the second business day after the day on which the Rescheduled Batch Instruction was originally scheduled for settlement (that is, generally on T+5), the delivering settlement participant must either:

- close out the Failed Settlement Shortfall on the next business day by purchasing the number of Financial Products of the relevant class equal to the shortfall; or
- acquire under a securities lending arrangement the number of Financial Products of the relevant class equal to the shortfall and deliver those Financial Products in Batch Settlement no more than two business days later.

== Options ==
Options on leading shares are traded on the ASX, with standardised sets of strike prices and expiry dates. Liquidity is provided by market makers who are required to provide quotes. Each market maker is assigned two or more stocks. A stock can have more than one market maker, and they compete with one another. A market maker may choose one or both of:

- Make a market continuously, on a set of 18 options.
- Make a market in response to a quote request, in any option up to 9 months out.

In both cases there is a minimum quantity (5 or 10 contracts depending on the shares) and a maximum spread permitted.

Due to the higher risks in options, brokers must check clients' suitability before allowing them to trade options. Clients may both take (i.e. buy) and write (i.e. sell) options. For written positions, the client must put up margin.

== Interest rate market ==
The ASX interest rate market is the set of corporate bonds, floating rate notes, and bond-like preference shares listed on the exchange. These securities are traded and settled in the same way as ordinary shares, but the ASX provides information such as their maturity, effective interest rate, etc., to aid comparison.

== Futures ==
The Sydney Futures Exchange (SFE) was the 10th largest derivatives exchange in the world, providing derivatives in interest rates, equities, currencies and commodities. The SFE is now part of ASX and its most active products are:

- SPI 200 Futures – Futures contracts on an index representing the largest 200 stocks on the Australian Stock Exchange by market capitalisation.
- AU 90-day Bank Accepted Bill Futures – Australia's equivalent of T-Bill futures.
- 3-Year Bond Futures – Futures contracts on Australian 3-year bonds.
- 10-Year Bond Futures – Futures contracts on Australian 10-year bonds.

The ASX trades futures over the ASX 50, ASX 200 and ASX property indexes, and over grain, electricity and wool. Options over grain futures are also traded.

== Market indices ==
The ASX maintains stock indexes concerning stocks traded on the exchange in conjunction with Standard & Poor's. There is a hierarchy of index groups called the S&P/ASX 20, S&P/ASX 50, S&P/ASX 100, S&P/ASX 200 and S&P/ASX 300, notionally containing the 20, 50, 100, 200 and 300 largest companies listed on the exchange, subject to some qualifications.

== See also ==
- Economy of Australia
- Australian Securities and Investments Commission
- All Ordinaries
- Charles Challice, the fifth chief executive of the Sydney Stock Exchange
- Asia-Pacific Central Securities Depository Group
- CCP Global

=== Lists ===
- List of stock exchanges
- List of futures exchanges
- List of Australian exchange-traded funds
