= Capital Markets Index =

Investment tool

The Capital Markets Index (CPMKTS) was an investment tool that tracked the value of traditional investment-grade U.S. capital market securities. It viewed the markets broadly and included approximately 9,500 equity, fixed income, and money market instruments. The American stock exchange published sub-indexes CPMKTE, CPMKTB, and CPMKTL, tracking equities, bonds, and liquidity, respectively.

CPMKTS was launched by Dorchester Capital Management Company of Houston, Texas on May 4, 2006. The Capital Markets Index was carried on the American stock exchange that updated every 15 seconds. The trademark was canceled on October 24, 2014.

The index is inactive, and the last available data is from December 2015.

== Sources ==
- "Dorchester and CPMKTS: Developing an Improved Risk-Reward Measure and Better Asset-Allocation Tool". The Capital Markets Index.
- Tsuruoka, Doug (May 23, 2006). "New Index Aiming For Big Picture; Capital Markets Index; Dorchester says it's the first such view of value of all the capital markets". Investors Business Daily.
- "CPMKTS, The Capital Markets Index, Launches as First Measure of Aggregate U.S. Market Performance". The Capital Markets Index.
- Hoffman, David (May 8, 2006). "Index to reflect 'the market in aggregate'". Investment News.
- "Dorchester Capital Management: Benchmark Research Results--Investment Professionals". Harris Interactive. May 2004.
