= Philadelphia Gold and Silver Index =

Stock exchange index

The Philadelphia Gold and Silver Index is an index of thirty precious metal mining companies that is traded on the Philadelphia Stock Exchange. The index is represented by the symbol "XAU", which may be a source of some confusion as this symbol is also used under the ISO 4217 currency standard to denote one troy ounce of gold. The Philadelphia Gold and Silver Index and the NYSE Arca Gold BUGS Index are the two most watched gold indices on the market.

== Index components ==
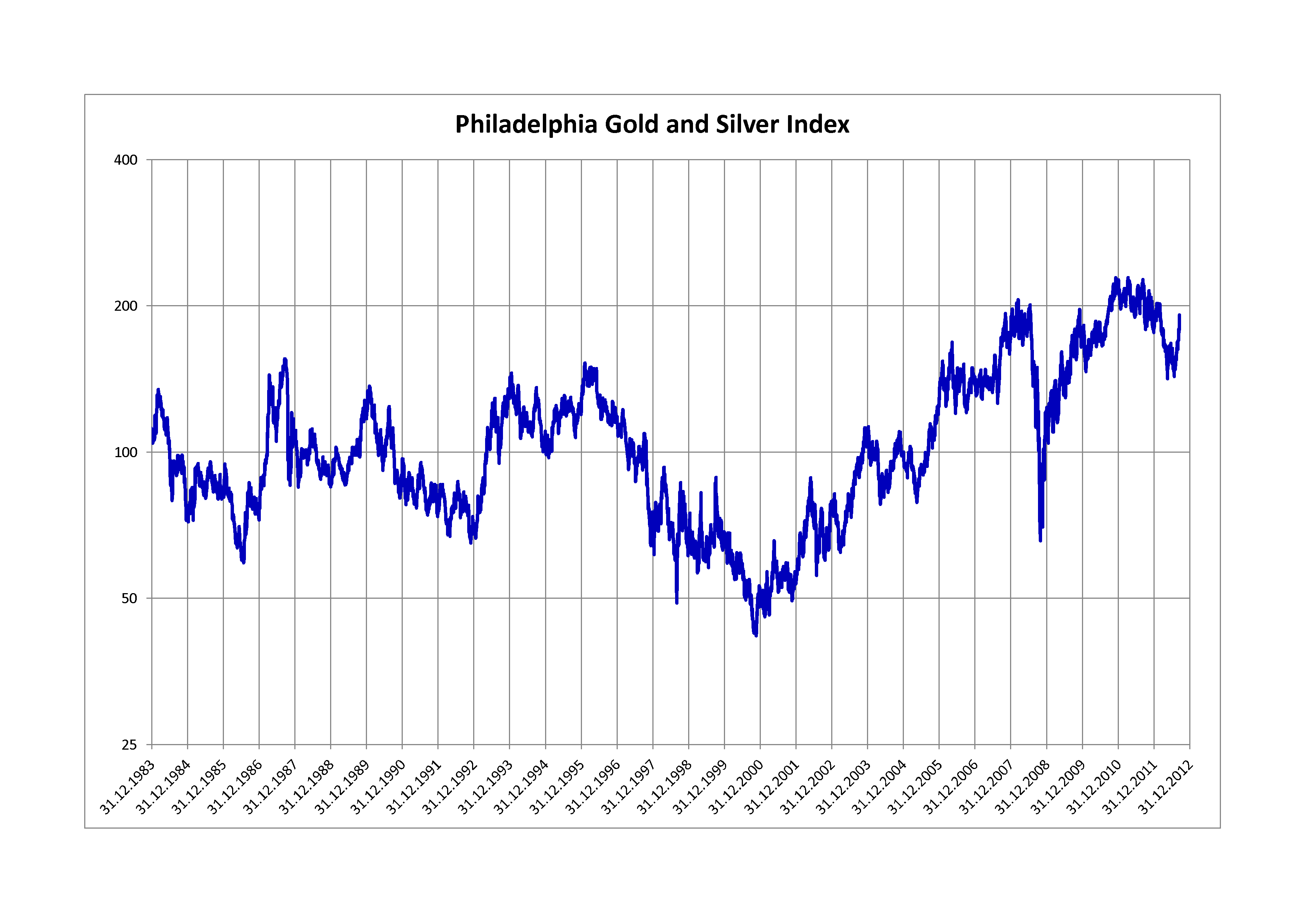
Philadelphia Gold and Silver Index 1983–2012

Weight	Name	Trading Symbol
1	AGNICO EAGLE MINES	AEM
2	ALAMOS GOLD INC.	AGI
3	ANGLOGLD ASHANTI ORD	AU
4	B2GOLD CORP	BTG
5	BARRICK MINING CORPO	B
6	BUENAVENTURA MINING	BVN
7	CENTERRA GOLD INC.	CGAU
8	COEUR MINING, INC.	CDE
9	D/B/A SIBANYE-STLWTR	SBSW
10	ELDORADO GOLD CORP	EGO
11	FIRST MAJESTIC SILVE	AG
12	FRANCO-NEV CORP	FNV
13	FREEPORT MCMORAN	FCX
14	GOLD FIELDS LIMITED	GFI
15	HARMONY GOLD MINING	HMY
16	HECLA MINING CO	HL
17	IAMGOLD CORPORATION	IAG
18	KINROSS GOLD CP	KGC
19	MCEWEN MINING INC.	MUX
20	NEW GOLD INC	NGD
21	NEWMONT CP	NEM
22	NOVAGOLD RESOURCES I	NG
23	OR ROYALTIES INC.	OR
24	PAN AMER SILVER CORP	PAAS
25	PERPETUA RSRC CMN SH	PPTA
26	ROYAL GOLD, INC.	RGLD
27	SANDSTORM GOLD LTD.	SAND
28	SEABRIDGE GOLD INC	SA
29	SSR MINING INC	SSRM
30	WHEATON PRECIOUS MTL	WPM

== See also ==
- Silver as an investment
- NYSE Arca Gold BUGS Index
- Gold as an investment
- Gold mining
