= FIRS (index) =

The FIRS Index is a share index of the 13 privatisation-investment funds (PIFs) listed on the Banja Luka Stock Exchange (BLSE), established on 29 July 2004. FIRS stands for Indeks investicionih fondova Republike Srpske, which is Serbian for Investment Funds Index of Republika Srpska.

The highest value of the index to 22 September 2006, was on that day, at 4467.74.

Other indices on the Banja Luka Stock Exchange are the BIRS (an index of 12 leading shares) and ERS10 (an index of 10 companies from the power utility sector).

All of the companies listed on this index include the abbreviation a.d. (akcionarsko drušvo) at the end of their name, indicating their status of a public limited company.

== List of FIRS companies ==
Below is the list of the 13 FIRS companies on 30 August 2006.

- Balkan Investment Fond a.d. Banja Luka
- PIF Bors Invest Fond a.d. Banja Luka
- Euroinvest Fond a.d. Banja Luka
- PIF Aktiva Invest Fond a.d. Gradiška
- PIF Invest Nova Fond a.d. Bijeljina
- PIF Jahorina-Konseko a.d. Istočno Sarajevo – Pale
- Kristal Invest Fond a.d Banja Luka
- Polara Invest Fond a.d. Banja Luka
- PIF Privrednik a.d. Banja Luka
- PIF VB Fond a.d. Banja Luka
- PIF VIB Fond a.d. Banja Luka
- PIF Zepter Fond a.d. Banja Luka

== Performance ==
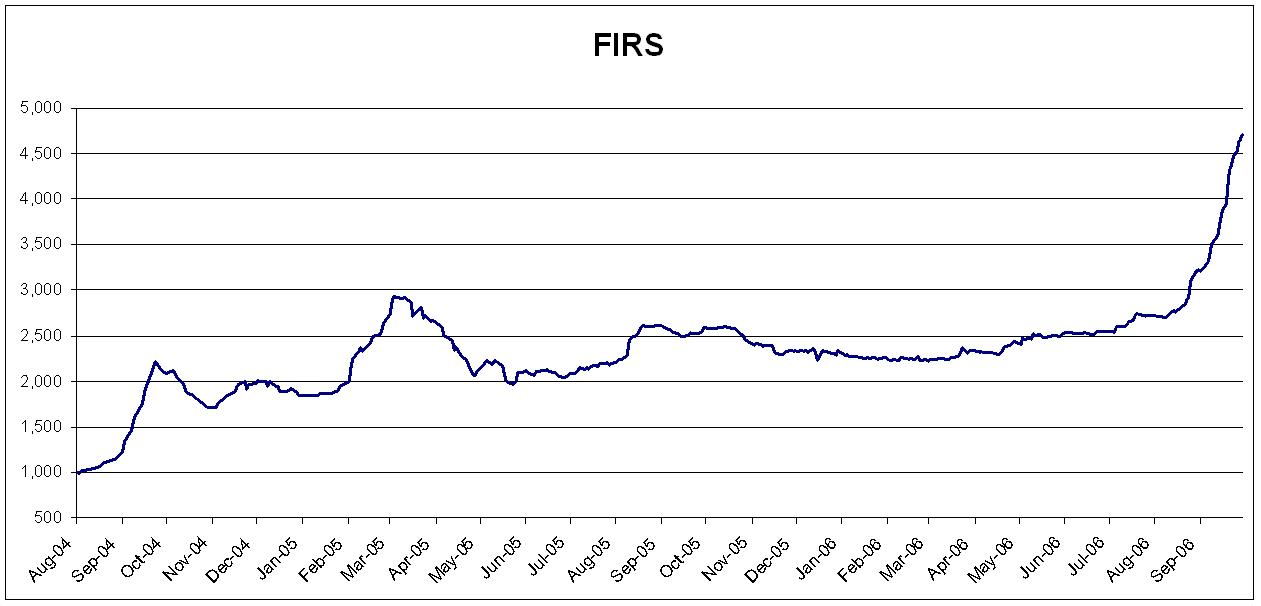
FIRS index movement

== See also ==
- Republika Srpska Securities Commission
