= S&P/ASX 50 =

Blue chip stock market index

The S&P/ASX 50 Index is a stock market index of Australian stocks listed on the Australian Securities Exchange from Standard & Poor's.

It is a part of the S&P Global 1200.

While the "ASX 50" often simply refers to the 50 largest companies by market capitalisation, the S&P/ASX 50 Index is calculated by using the S&P Dow Jones Indices market capitalization weighted and float-adjusted methodologies. All 50 companies also feature in the S&P/ASX 200.

== Constituent companies ==
As of August 2025, the constituent stocks of the ASX 50 in alphabetical order by symbol are:

Symbol	Company	GICS	Sector	Headquarters
ALL	Aristocrat Leisure	25	Consumer Discretionary	(Australia) Sydney
AMC	Amcor	15	Materials	(United Kingdom) Warmley, Bristol, England
ANZ	ANZ Bank	40	Financials	(Australia) Melbourne
BHP	BHP	15	Materials	(Australia) Melbourne
BXB	Brambles	20	Industrials	(Australia) Sydney
CAR	CAR Group	50	Communication Services	(Australia) Sydney
CBA	Commonwealth Bank	40	Financials	(Australia) Sydney
COH	Cochlear	35	Health Care	(Australia) Sydney
COL	Coles Group	30	Consumer Staples	(Australia) Melbourne
CPU	Computershare	45	Information Technology	(Australia) Adelaide
CSL	CSL	35	Health Care	(Australia) Melbourne
EVN	Evolution Mining	15	Materials	(Australia) Sydney
FMG	Fortescue	15	Materials	(Australia) Perth
FPH	Fisher & Paykel Healthcare	35	Health Care	(New Zealand) Auckland
GMG	Goodman Group	60	Real Estate	(Australia) Sydney
IAG	Insurance Australia Group	40	Financials	(Australia) Sydney
JBH	JB Hi-Fi	25	Consumer Discretionary	(Australia) Melbourne
JHX	James Hardie	15	Materials	(Australia) Melbourne
LYC	Lynas	15	Materials	(Australia) Perth
MPL	Medibank	40	Financials	(Australia) Melbourne
MQG	Macquarie Group	40	Financials	(Australia) Sydney
NAB	National Australia Bank	40	Financials	(Australia) Melbourne
NEM	Newmont	15	Materials	(United States) Greenwood Village, Colorado
NST	Northern Star Resources	15	Materials	(Australia) Perth
NWS	News Corp	50	Communication Services	(Australia) Sydney
ORG	Origin Energy	55	Utilities	(Australia) Sydney
PME	Pro Medicus	35	Health Care	(Australia) Melbourne
QAN	Qantas	20	Industrials	(Australia) Sydney
QBE	QBE Insurance	40	Financials	(Australia) Sydney
REA	REA Group	50	Communication Services	(Australia) Melbourne
RIO	Rio Tinto	15	Materials	(Australia) Melbourne / (United Kingdom) London
RMD	ResMed	35	Health Care	(United States) San Diego
S32	South32	15	Materials	(Australia) Perth
SCG	Scentre Group	60	Real Estate	(Australia) Sydney
SGH	Seven Group Holdings	20	Industrials	(Australia) Sydney
SGP	Stockland	60	Real Estate	(Australia) Sydney
SIG	Sigma Healthcare	35	Health Care	(Australia) Melbourne
SOL	Soul Patts	40	Financials	(Australia) Sydney
STO	Santos	10	Energy	(Australia) Adelaide
SUN	Suncorp	40	Financials	(Australia) Brisbane
TCL	Transurban	20	Industrials	(Australia) Melbourne
TLS	Telstra	50	Communication Services	(Australia) Melbourne
VAS	Vanguard Australian Shares	40	Financials	(Australia) Melbourne
WBC	Westpac	40	Financials	(Australia) Sydney
WES	Wesfarmers	25	Consumer Discretionary	(Australia) Perth
WDS	Woodside Energy	10	Energy	(Australia) Perth
WOW	Woolworths	30	Consumer Staples	(Australia) Sydney
XRO	Xero	45	Information Technology	(New Zealand) Wellington
XYZ	Block	40	Financials	(Australia) Sydney

== See also ==
- List of Australian exchange-traded funds
- S&P/ASX 20
- S&P/ASX 200
- S&P/ASX 300
- All Ordinaries
