= Amex Oil Index =

The NYSE Arca Oil Index, previously AMEX Oil Index, ticker symbol XOI, is a price-weighted index of the leading companies involved in the exploration, production, and development of petroleum. It measures the performance of the oil industry through changes in the sum of the prices of component stocks. The index was developed with a base level of 125 as of August 27, 1984.

== Components ==
The components of the index are as follows:

Company Name	Symbol
Hess Corporation	HES
Chevron Corporation	CVX
ConocoPhillips	COP
Occidental Petroleum	OXY
ExxonMobil	XOM
TotalEnergies	TOT
Shell	RDSa
BP	BP
Marathon Oil	MRO
Marathon Petroleum	MPC
Valero Energy	VLO
Repsol	REP
Sunoco	SUN
Ecopetrol	EC
Petrobras	PBR
Phillips 66	PSX
PetroChina	PTR
Equinor	EQNR
Suncor Energy Inc	SU
