= OMX Stockholm PI =

Stock market index

The OMX Stockholm PI (OMXSPI), formerly known as SAX All Share, is a stock market index of all shares that trade on the Stockholm Stock Exchange.
