= S&P/ASX 20 =

Blue chip stock market index

The S&P/ASX 20 index is a stock market index of stocks listed on the Australian Securities Exchange from Standard & Poor's. While the "ASX 20" often simply refers to the 20 largest companies by market capitalisation, the S&P/ASX 20 Index is calculated by using the S&P Dow Jones Indices market capitalization weighted and float-adjusted methodologies. All 20 companies also feature in the S&P/ASX 50.

The S&P/ASX20 companies are headquartered in four Australian cities with nine headquartered in Melbourne, six in Sydney, four in Perth and one in Adelaide. There are no companies headquartered in Australia's third largest city of Brisbane.

== Constituent companies ==
As of May 2022, the constituent stocks of the ASX 20 in alphabetical order by symbol are:

Symbol	Company	GICS sector		Headquarters
Symbol	Company	Code	Name	Headquarters
ALL	Aristocrat Leisure	25	Consumer Discretionary	(Australia) Sydney
ANZ	ANZ Bank	40	Financials	(Australia) Melbourne
BHP	BHP	15	Materials	(Australia) Melbourne
CBA	Commonwealth Bank	40	Financials	(Australia) Sydney
COL	Coles Group	30	Consumer Staples	(Australia) Melbourne
CSL	CSL	35	Health Care	(Australia) Melbourne
FMG	Fortescue	15	Materials	(Australia) Perth
GMG	Goodman Group	60	Real Estate	(Australia) Sydney
MQG	Macquarie Group	40	Financials	(Australia) Sydney
NAB	National Australia Bank	40	Financials	(Australia) Melbourne
NCM	Newcrest	15	Materials	(Australia) Melbourne
RIO	Rio Tinto	15	Materials	(Australia) Melbourne / (United Kingdom) London
S32	South32	15	Materials	(Australia) Perth
STO	Santos	10	Energy	(Australia) Adelaide
TCL	Transurban	20	Industrials	(Australia) Melbourne
TLS	Telstra	50	Telecommunication Services	(Australia) Melbourne
WBC	Westpac	40	Financials	(Australia) Sydney
WDS	Woodside Energy	10	Energy	(Australia) Perth
WES	Wesfarmers	30	Consumer Staples	(Australia) Perth
WOW	Woolworths	30	Consumer Staples	(Australia) Sydney

== See also ==
- S&P/ASX 50
- S&P/ASX 200
- S&P/ASX 300
- All Ordinaries
