= S&P Vietnam 10 Index =

The S&P Vietnam 10 Index is a stock market index from Standard & Poor's. The index was launched on September 19, 2008.

== Components at launch ==
Company	GICS Sector
FPT CORP	Information Technology
PETROLEUM TECHNICAL SERVICES CORPORATION	Energy
PETROVIETNAM DRILLING AND WELL	Energy
PETROVIETNAM FERT & CHEMICAL	Materials
PETROVIETNAM INSURANCE JSC	Financials
SONGDA URBAN & INDUSTRIAL ZO	Consumer Discretionary
PHA LAI THERMAL POWER JOINT STOCK CO	Utilities
VINCOM JSC	Financials
TAN TAO INDUSTRIAL PARK CORP	Industrials
KINHBAC CITY DEVELOPMENT	Financials
