= FTSE Bursa Malaysia KLCI =

Malaysian stock market index

- Foundation: 4 April 1986 (as KLCI); 6 July 2009 (as FBMKLCI)
- Operator: FTSE Group; Bursa Malaysia
- Exchanges: Bursa Malaysia
- Constituents: 30
- Type: Large cap
- Market cap: RM509,019 million (as of 28 February 2014)
- Weighting method: Capitalisation-weighted
- Website: ftse.com

The FTSE Bursa Malaysia KLCI (FBM KLCI) is a capitalisation-weighted stock market index, composed of the 30 largest companies on the Bursa Malaysia by market capitalisation that meet the eligibility requirements of the FTSE Bursa Malaysia Index Ground Rules. The index is jointly operated by FTSE and Bursa Malaysia.

== History ==
It was first introduced on 4 April 1986 as the Kuala Lumpur Composite Index (KLCI), with a base value of 100, dated on 1 January 1977.

In 2006, Bursa Malaysia partnered with FTSE to provide a suite of indices for the Malaysian market, to enhance the KLCI. FTSE Bursa Malaysia KLCI was one of the indices created to replace the KLCI. The new index was adopted on 6 July 2009, with the opening value taken from the closing value of the old KLCI on 3 July 2009.

The enhancement will adopt the internationally recognised index calculation formula to increase transparency as well as making the index more tradable.

== Annual returns ==
The following table shows the annual development of the FTSE Bursa Malaysia KLCI since 1976.

Year	Closing level	Change in index in points	Change in index in %
1976	91.68	6.61	7.77
1977	113.39	21.71	23.68
1978	156.22	42.83	37.77
1979	205.59	49.37	31.60
1980	366.70	161.11	78.36
1981	380.82	14.12	3.85
1982	291.45	−89.37	−23.47
1983	401.60	110.15	37.79
1984	303.56	−98.04	−24.41
1985	233.48	−70.08	−23.09
1986	252.43	18.95	8.12
1987	261.19	8.76	3.47
1988	357.38	96.19	36.83
1989	562.28	204.90	57.33
1990	505.92	−56.36	−10.02
1991	556.22	50.30	9.94
1992	643.96	87.74	15.77
1993	1,275.32	631.36	98.04
1994	971.21	−304.11	−23.85
1995	995.17	23.96	2.47
1996	1,237.96	242.79	24.40
1997	594.44	−643.52	−51.98
1998	586.13	−8.31	−1.40
1999	812.33	226.20	38.59
2000	679.64	−132.69	−16.33
2001	696.09	16.45	2.42
2002	646.32	−49.77	−7.15
2003	793.94	147.62	22.84
2004	907.43	113.49	14.29
2005	899.79	−7.64	−0.84
2006	1,096.24	196.45	21.83
2007	1,445.03	348.79	31.82
2008	876.75	−568.28	−39.33
2009	1,272.78	396.03	45.17
2010	1,518.91	246.13	19.34
2011	1,530.73	11.82	0.78
2012	1,688.95	158.22	10.34
2013	1,866.96	178.01	10.54
2014	1,761.25	−105.71	−5.66
2015	1,692.51	−68.74	−3.90
2016	1,641.73	−50.78	−3.00
2017	1,796.81	155.08	9.45
2018	1,690.58	−106.23	−5.91
2019	1,588.76	−101.82	−6.02
2020	1,627.21	38.45	2.42
2021	1,567.53	−59.68	−3.67
2022	1,495.49	−72.04	−4.60
2023	1,454.66	−40.83	−2.73
2024	1,642.33	187.67	12.90
2025	1,680.11	37.78	2.30

== Constituents ==
The 30 constituent companies of the FBMKLCI, updated as of 5 December 2024:

Constituent Name	Stock Code	Sector	Market Cap (MYR)
99 SPEED MART RETAIL HOLDINGS BERHAD	5326	Retailers	N/A
AXIATA GROUP BERHAD	6888	Mobile network, network infrastructure & digital internet	26.48 billion
CELCOMDIGI BERHAD	6947	Telecommunications service & Internet services	47.63 billion
CIMB GROUP HOLDINGS BERHAD	1023	Financial services	73.59 billion
GAMUDA BERHAD	5398	Construction	N/A
HONG LEONG BANK BHD	5819	Financial services	42.55 billion
HONG LEONG FINANCIAL GROUP BHD	1082	Financial services	19.99 billion
IHH HEALTHCARE BERHAD	5225	Healthcare	53.04 billion
IOI CORPORATION BHD	1961	Plantations	25.05 billion
KUALA LUMPUR KEPONG BHD	2445	Plantation	24.06 billion
Malayan Banking Berhad	1155	Financial services	120.73 billion
MAXIS BERHAD	6012	Telecommunications service & Internet services	29.49 billion
MISC BHD	3816	Energy shipping, Maritime services	37.78 billion
MR D.I.Y. GROUP (M) BERHAD	5296	Retail	17.48 billion
NESTLE (M) BHD	4707	Food & Beverages	30.06 billion
PETRONAS CHEMICALS GROUP BHD	5183	Chemicals	55.36 billion
PETRONAS DAGANGAN BHD	5681	Oil and gas	20.29 billion
PETRONAS GAS BHD	6033	Oil and gas	36.30 billion
PPB GROUP BHD	4065	Plantation & Properties	21.26 billion
PRESS METAL ALUMINIUM HOLDINGS BERHAD	8869	Metals	44.16 billion
PUBLIC BANK BHD	1295	Financial services	81.65 billion
QL RESOURCES BHD	7084	Agriculture	15.77 billion
RHB BANK BERHAD	1066	Financial services	24.10 billion
SIME DARBY BHD	4197	Conglomerate	19.73 billion
SD GUTHRIE BERHAD	5285	Plantation	30.43 billion
SUNWAY BERHAD	5211	Industrial	N/A
TELEKOM MALAYSIA BHD	4863	Telecommunications	25.17 billion
Tenaga Nasional	5347	Electric power industry	83.01 billion
YTL CORPORATION BHD	4677	Conglomerate	42.88 billion
YTL POWER INTERNATIONAL BHD	6742	Electric power industry	44.06 billion

== Eligibility ==
The two main eligibility requirements stated in the FTSE Bursa Malaysia Index Ground Rules are the free float and liquidity requirements.

=== Free float ===
Each company is required to have a minimum free float of 15%. The free float excludes restricted shareholding like cross holdings, significant long term holdings by founders, their families and/or directors, restricted employee share schemes, government holdings and portfolio investments subject to a lock in clause, for the duration of that clause. A free float factor is applied to the market capitalisation of each company in accordance with the banding specified in the FTSE Bursa Malaysia Ground Rules. The factor is used to determine the attribution of the company's market activities in the index.

=== Liquidity ===
A liquidity screen is applied to ensure the company's stocks are liquid enough to be traded. Companies must ensure that at least 10% of their free float adjusted shares in issue is traded in the 12 months prior to an annual index review in December.

It contains 30 companies from the main market with approximately 900 to 1000 listed companies. The index has a base value of 100 as of 2 January 1977.

== See also ==
- FTSE Bursa Malaysia Index
