= Colombo Stock Exchange Sector indices =

The Colombo Stock Exchange Sector indices are a set of sector based price indices in the Colombo Stock Exchange. The Colombo Stock Exchange (CSE) is the main stock exchange in Sri Lanka.

In addition to the CSE Sector indices the Colombo Stock Exchange has two main price indices: the All Share Price Index (ASPI), and the S&P Sri Lanka 20 (S&P SL20).

The Colombo Stock Exchange also facilitates Government and Corporate bond markets, and provides guidance with derivative markets and products.

The Colombo Stock Exchange Sector indices consist of the following 20 industry group sector price indices and codes:

- Energy – (SPCSEEIP)
- Materials – (SPCSEMIP)
- Capital Goods – (SPCSECGP)
- Commercial and Professional Services – (SPCSECPP)
- Transportation – (SPCSETP)
- Automobiles and Components – (SPCSEAMP)
- Consumer Durables and Apparel – (SPCSECAP)
- Consumer Services – (SPCSECSP)
- Retailing – (SPCSERP)
- Food and Staples Retailing – (SPCSEFRP)
- Food, Beverage, and Tobacco – (SPCSEFBP)
- Household and Personal Products – (SPCSEHPP)
- Health Care Equipment and Services – (SPCSEHSP)
- Pharmaceuticals, Biotechnology, and Life Sciences – (SPCSEPLP)
- Banks – (SPCSEBP)
- Diversified Financials – (SPCSEDFP)
- Insurance – (SPCSEINP)
- Telecommunication Services --- (SPCSETIP)
- Utilities – (SPCSEUIP)
- Real Estate – (SPCSEREP)
