= S&P/ASX 300 =

Australian stock market index

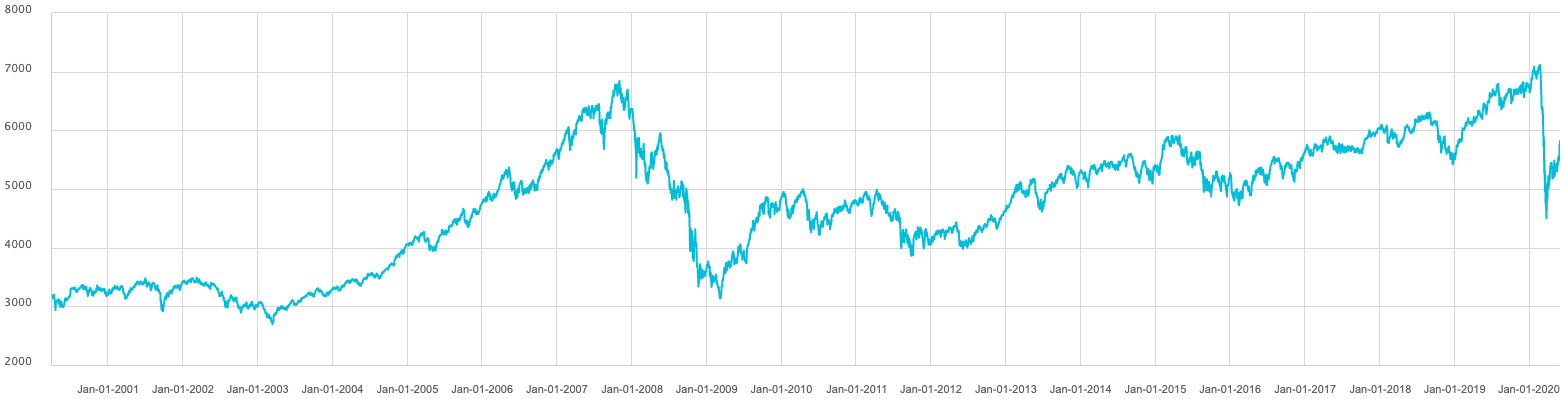
- ASX 300 Index level from 2000 to 2020
- Foundation: 3 April 2000
- Operator: S&P Dow Jones Indices
- Exchanges: ASX
- Constituents: 297
- Type: Large-Medium Cap
- Market cap: AU$1.63 trillion
- Weighting method: Free-float capitalization weighted
- Related indices: S&P/ASX 200, All Ordinaries
- Website: https://us.spindices.com/indices/equity/sp-asx-300
- Bloomberg: AS52:IND

The S&P/ASX 300, or simply, ASX 300, is a stock market index of Australian stocks listed on the Australian Securities Exchange (ASX). The index is market-capitalisation weighted, meaning each company included is in proportion to the index's total market value, and float-adjusted, meaning the index only considers shares available to public investors.

The index measures the performance of the top 300 companies listed on the ASX. The index was formed in April 2000, by Standard and Poor's Dow Jones Indices. It was created to provide broader exposure to the Australian equity market compared to the S&P/ASX 200. The index incorporates all the companies within the S&P/ASX 200 and adds 100 more companies based on their market capitalisation. Index components are reviewed semi-annually by Standard & Poor's. The average annual total return of the index is 19.3% as of 08/04/2020, however, there have been multiple periods where the index fell over 30%.

== Selection criteria ==
In order for a company to be included within the ASX 300, it must meet the following selection criteria:

=== Listing ===
Securities must be listed on the ASX to be included in the index.

=== Domicile ===
The ASX consists of primary and secondary listings. A primary listing is when the company's equity is listed on a single exchange. A secondary listing (cross-listing) is when the ASX is not the primary exchange and the equity is listed on multiple foreign stock-exchanges. The ASX300 includes both primary and secondary listings. Foreign and domestic domiciled securities can be included within the index.

=== Eligible securities ===
Securities must be common or equity preferred stocks. Hybrid securities (e.g. convertible stock, bonds, warrants and preferred stock) that provide the holder with a promised fixed return, are excluded from the index as these instruments possess inherent characteristics that differ from standard equity securities.

Companies that are in the process of a merger or acquisition are excluded.

=== Market capitalisation ===
Market capitalisation is the product of price per share multiplied by the total number of shares outstanding. Stocks must meet the minimum threshold of AUD 100 million and is based on the average daily market capitalization of the security over the last 6 months.

=== Liquidity ===
Strict liquidity requirements ensure the index maintains accurate pricing. Relative liquidity is calculated:

$\text{Relative Liquidity} = {Stock Median Liquidity \over Market Liquidity}$

- Stock Median Liquidity: Median daily traded value divided by the average market capitalization for the last six months.
- Market Liquidity: Market capitalisation weighted average median liquidities of all companies in the All Ordinaries index.

Stocks require a minimum relative liquidity of 30%. Is this drops to 15%, the stock is removed in the next rebalancing.

== Calculation ==
The ASX 300 is capitalisation weighted, meaning, a share's weight within the index is proportional to its total market value. Market capitalisation is equal to share price multiplied by total shares outstanding, while market value is equal to share price multiplied by the total number of publicly tradable shares.

Index level is calculated:

$\text{Index Level} = {\sum \left({P_i} \cdot {Q_i}\right) \over Divisor}$

Where,

$P_i=Price$

$Q_i= Share Count$

The index can be calculated by dividing the sum of each securities market capitalisation by a factor referred to as the "Divisor". For example, if the total adjusted market capitalisation of all included shares were $1 trillion, and the divisor were $1 billion, the index level would be equal to 1000. The divisor is a tool used by the S&P to ensure the index only represents changes in market driven price movements. When stocks are added or deleted, the divisor is adjusted to maintain the same market value of the index. Similarly, in the event of non-market driven price movements (e.g. corporate actions, company inclusion or exclusion from the index), the divisor is adjusted to remove the effects of these actions on index value.

=== Divisor Adjustments ===
An event that causes deviations in total market value of the ASX 300 while each stock price is held constant requires an adjustment of the divisor.

The divisor can be calculated:

$Divisor={MV\over Index Value}$

Where,

$MV=Market Value$

In the case where stocks are removed or added, the market value of the index will change, causing the index level to also change. The divisor is adjusted to account for the change in market value in order to maintain a constant index level.

Adjusted Divisor can be calculated:

$Divisor_{New}={MV+CMV\over Index Value}$

Where,

$CMV=Change In Market Value$

=== Float adjustment ===
The ASX 300 is a float-adjusted index – the number of shares outstanding is reduced in order to remove shares that are not available to public investors. Each stock is assigned an Investable Weight Factor. An IWF can be defined as the percentage of shares freely available to be traded to the total number of shares outstanding.

Float-adjusted number of shares (Q) can be calculated:

$Q_i=IWF_i*TotalShares_i$

Adjustments to share count can be made to reflect foreign ownership restrictions or to adjust the weight of a stock. IWF's can be adjusted downwards by the Standard and Poor's Australian Index Committee to prevent illiquid stocks from being included at a disproportionately high weight. Each company IWF is reviewed annually unless an event occurs causing the float of the company to change by more than 5%.

== Index maintenance ==
=== Rebalancing ===
Rebalancing is the process of removing or adding stocks in order to achieve a desired risk profile and to meet certain index requirements (e.g. liquidity, weighting). This usually occurs after asset valuations have deviated from initial values over a certain period of time. For the ASX 300, rebalancing occurs semi-annually and involves updating included shares and investable weight factors (IWFs). Eligible shares receive a review to determine their inclusion based on their relative ranking with other included shares. This is based on market capitalisation ranking and is subject to liquidity standards that must be met. Stocks that fail to meet the minimum liquidity threshold are removed from the ranking.

=== Buffers ===
The S&P employs exclusion and inclusion buffers to minimise turnover, a term used to identify the action of replacing one stock with another. A stock will be considered for inclusion once a current constituent stock reaches a rank below the deletion threshold. The potential company must also satisfy the addition ranking. Rankings are based on float-adjusted market capitalisation.

	Rank Buffer for	
Index	Addition	Deletion
S&P/ASX 20	14th or higher	26th or lower
S&P/ASX 50	39th or higher	61st or lower
S&P/ASX 100	84th or higher	116th or lower
S&P/ASX 200	179th or higher	221st or lower
S&P/ASX 300	274th or higher	326th or lower

== Investing ==
Investing in the ASX300 is possible via an index fund, in the form of mutual funds or exchange traded funds. These investment vehicles, depending on the operating philosophy, aim to replicate or exceed the performance characteristics of the ASX300.

=== Mutual Funds ===
This investment method involves pooling money from different investors to purchase securities. Passive funds will aim to manage a portfolio of securities that replicate the weightings of each constituent of the ASX300. Funds will, ideally, match the returns of the ASX300 before management fees and other expenses. Active managers will seek to outperform the index benchmark by exploiting market inefficiencies. Outperforming the index can be defined as either providing superior risk-adjusted returns, or simply generating excess returns.

=== Exchange Traded Funds ===
These are similar to mutual funds, only, ETF's are traded on an exchange and require a lower minimum investment. Since ETF's trade as securities, their price can deviate from the underlying index value. An example of an ETF tracking the ASX300 is the Vanguard Australia Shares ETF.

The Vanguard Australian Shares ETF has underperformed by 0.17 pps as of 31/03/2020 since its inception on 4 May 2009, generating a return of 6.83%5.

Global X offers an ETF under the code A300.

Australian active equity managers tracking the ASX 300, on average, have underperformed. A recent study has also found that successful Australian active managers add value for investors if the distribution of returns is large, thereby enabling a greater number of profitable opportunities.

It has been shown that the investment style of 'switching', where an investor moves into a different investment strategy by selling their previous investment, occurs in the Australian equity market between the Mining and Financial industry.

== Performance ==
=== 2000–2010 ===
On 31 March 2000, the ASX300 closed its first day of trading at 3133.26 points.

==== Mining Boom ====
From 2003 to 2008, the index achieved a gross return of 186%. This period in Australia was characterised by the mining boom that occurred when bulk commodity prices rose in response to the industrialisation and urbanisation of the Chinese economy. During the period from 2000 to 2010, 30% of the total market capitalisation of the ASX300 was concentrated within the materials sector, doubling within a period of five years. This was largely driven by increased company earnings. Revenue from the mining industry increased by $60 bil during this period, likewise, earnings increased by $37 bil, leading to higher resource company valuations relative to other sectors.

==== 2008 financial crisis ====
The index ended 2007 at 6356.72 points, after previously reaching its all-time high of 6845.38 on 1 November 2007. Throughout 2008, the ASX300 experienced extensive losses as a consequence of the 2008 financial crisis, particularly with the folding credit markets and the collapse of Lehman Brothers in mid-September, 2008. Despite the relatively subdued impact upon the Australian economy compared to other markets such as the US, Europe and Asia, the ASX300 fell by 41.94% during 2008 and exceeded the S&P500's loss which stood at – 35.61%3. Major losses were incurred by retirees and retail investors.

From its inception to 4 January 2010, the ASX 300 gained 1,741.03 points, closing at 4874.29 points. This represented a gross return of 55.56%.

=== 2010–2020 ===
On 4 January 2010, the ASX300 closed at 4874.29, 55% above its lowest point following the GFC.

On 10 January 2020, the ASX 300 broke its previous record high of 6845.38 points set on 10 November 2007.

From 2010 to January 2020, the ASX 300 increased by 1828.9 points to post a 10-year gain of 37.6%.

==== Coronavirus Pandemic ====
The coronavirus pandemic first emerged in December 2019. Despite this time, the ASX300 maintained its bull run from the previous decade into 2020. The index reached its all-time high of 7115.69 on 20 January. The index began to slowly retreat as COVID-19 extended its spread beyond China. By the end of February, the index fell by 720.1 points (10.1%) and on 8 March, losses were extended with the onset of the 2020 Russia-Saudi Arabia oil price war. The index closed at 4500 on 24 March, marking a 34.12% drop since February's high. This put the index well into bear territory which is typically defined by a 20% fall within a 52-weeks of a high. On 18 March, the Reserve Bank of Australia (RBA) agreed to engage in a variety of measures designed to support the economy. The ASX300 gained 1250 points (27%) during the months of April–May 2020, aided by the RBA's loose monetary policy, including quantitative easing and a Term Funding Facility for the banking system.

== Components and characteristics ==
=== Annual Returns ===
The following table lists the annual return of the ASX 300 over the last ten years as of 30 April 2020.

Year	Annual Return
2010	31.67%
2011	0.66%
2012	−8.44%
2013	15.78%
2014	5.2%
2015	6.67%
2016	−9.39%
2017	13.16%
2018	1.26%
2019	5.95%
2020	−13.34%

=== Constituents ===
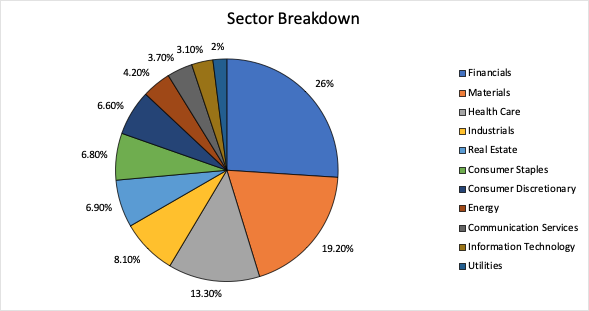
ASX 300 Sector Weighting

Top ten companies included in the ASX300 ranked by index weight as of 30 April 2020.

Company	Symbol	Sector
CSL Ltd	CSL	Health Care
Commonwealth Bank Australia	CBA	Financials
BHP Group Ltd	BHP	Materials
Westpac Banking Corp	WBC	Financials
ANZ Banking Corp	ANZ	Financials
National Australia Bank Ltd	NAB	Financials
Woolworths Group Ltd	WOW	Consumer Staples
Wesfarmers Ltd	WES	Consumer Staples
Telstra Corp Ltd	TLS	Communication Services
Transurban Group NPV	TCL	Industrials

=== Geographic Allocation ===
Country	Number of Constituents	Index Weight (%)	Total Market Capitalization (AUD Mil)
Australia	280	96.1	1,577,513.95
New Zealand	9	2	32,869.71
United States	4	1.7	25,719.76
France	1	0.1	1,457.98
United Kingdom	1	0.1	1,435.76
Canada	2	0.1	768.07

=== Risk Characteristics ===
Standard deviation is used as a proxy for risk. Using this measure, annualized returns are adjusted to arrive at a figure representing the return an investor receives by taking on an additional unit of risk.

	ASX 300			ASX 200		
	3 yrs	5 yrs	10 yrs	3 yrs	5 yrs	10 yrs
Standard Deviation	16.78%	15.17%	13.6	16.67%	15.12%	13.57%
Annualized Risk-Adjusted Returns	0.12	0.23	0.43	0.12	0.23	0.44

The ASX 200 has shown a difference of 0.01 points in the 10 year annualized risk-adjusted return.

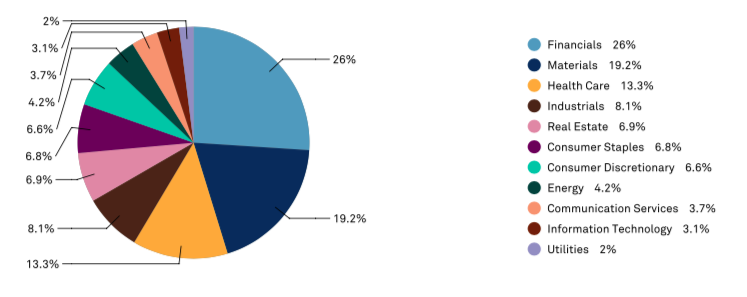
ASX 300 weighting by sector

== Issues with market representation ==
Mathematically, weighing securities by their market value causes overpriced stocks to be over-weighted, and under-priced stocks to be under-weighted. This creates deviation in true company value relative to its present value of future cash flows, thereby hindering accurate price discovery. The ASX 300 is heavily skewed towards large-cap stocks, making up 40-50% of the index. As of 30 April 2020, the financial sector constituted for 26% of index value and materials accounted for 19.2%.

== See also ==
- S&P/ASX 20
- S&P/ASX 50
- S&P/ASX 200
- All Ordinaries
- Dow Jones Industrial Average
- S&P 500
- S&P Europe 350
- Index Fund
