= S&P/TSX Venture Composite Index =

Canadian stock market index

The S&P/TSX Venture Composite Index is a stock market index intended as a broad market indicator for the TSX Venture Exchange, which lists Canadian companies that do not meet the criteria to be listed on the Toronto Stock Exchange. The index includes about 500 companies, weighted by market capitalization. It is revised quarterly to remove companies which have a weight of less than 0.05% of the index, and to include companies which, if included, would have a weight of more than 0.05%. The index is managed by Standard & Poor's, which also manages other stock market indices in Canada and other countries.

== See also ==
- S&P/TSX Composite
