= OTCM QX ADR 30 Index =

OTCQX ADR 30
- Operator: OTC Markets Group
- Exchanges: OTCQX
- Constituents: 30

The OTCM QX ADR 30 (OTCQX30) was a stock market index comprising 30 American depositary receipts (ADR) quoted on the over-the-counter OTCQX. It was launched in April 2014.
