= HUI Gold Index =

Weighted index used in gold trading

The NYSE Arca Gold BUGS Index is a modified equal dollar weighted index of companies involved in gold mining. BUGS stands for Basket of Unhedged Gold Stocks. It is also referred to by its ticker symbol "HUI".

== Overview ==
The HUI Index and Philadelphia Gold and Silver Index (XAU) are the two most watched gold indices on the market. The main difference between them is that the HUI Index takes into account only gold producer stocks whereas the XAU Index includes both gold and silver producers. The Gold BUGS Index was designed to provide significant exposure to near term movements in gold prices by including companies that do not hedge their gold production beyond 1.5 years.

== Development ==
The HUI Index was developed with a base value of 200.00 as of March 15, 1996. The NYSE Arca Gold BUGS Index currently consists of 15 of the largest and most widely held public gold production companies. Since bottoming in late 2000, HUI went on to be the top-performing US stock sector of the decade, rising by about 1600%.

== Index components ==
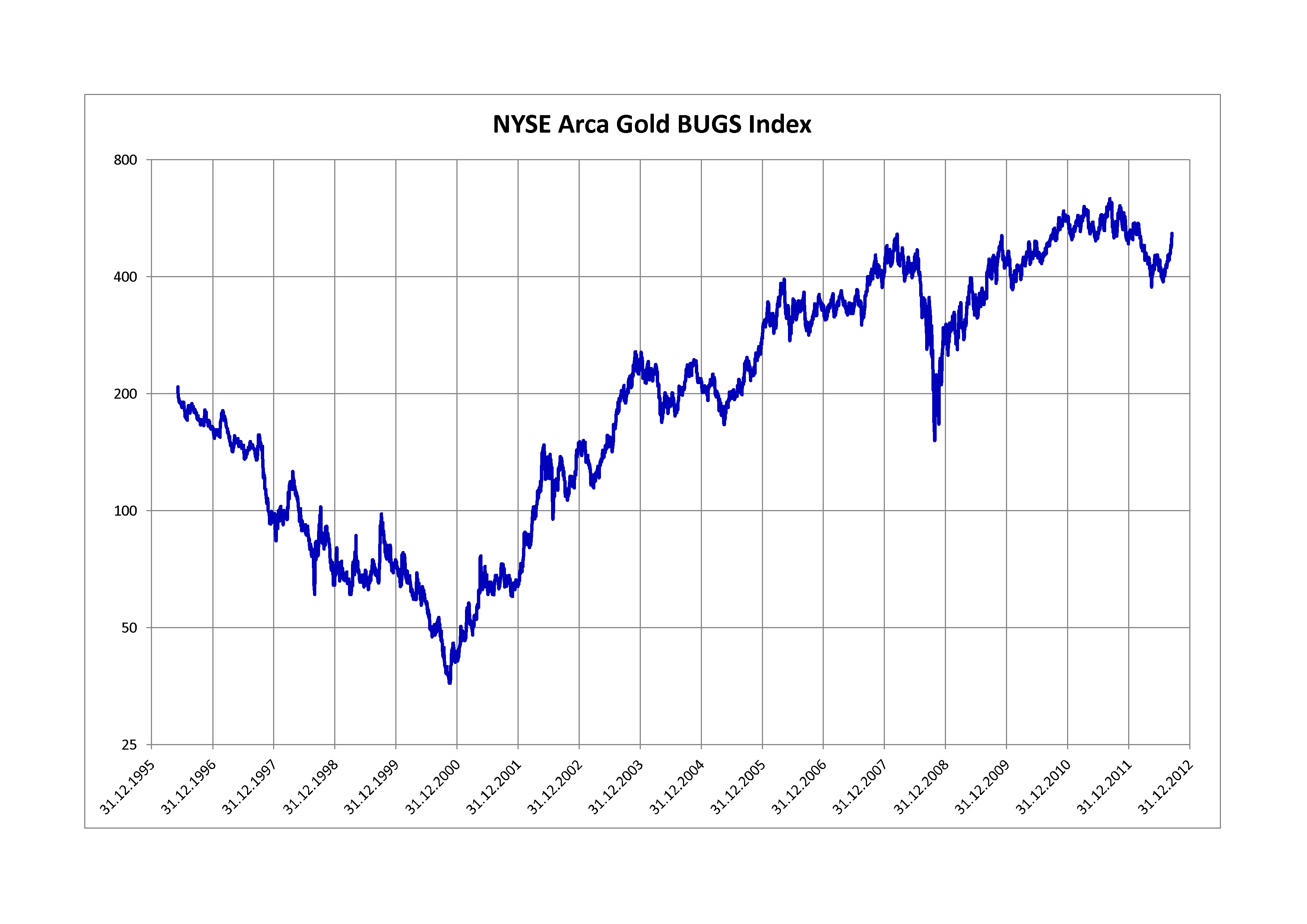
NYSE Arca Gold BUGS Index 1996–2012

Company name	Symbol	Weighting (Note: The weightings above are updated infrequently. See NYSE Arca Gold BUGS Index Closing Index Composition for the current composition weighting.)
Newmont	NYSE: NEM	16.45%
Barrick Gold	NYSE: ABX	13.83%
Goldcorp	NYSE: GG	11.36%
Agnico Eagle	NYSE: AEM	3.86%
Randgold Resources	Nasdaq: GOLD	3.80%
Kinross Gold	NYSE: KGC	3.77%
AngloGold Ashanti	NYSE: AU	4.08%
Gold Fields	NYSE: GFI	3.95%
Compania de Minas Buenaventura	NYSE: BVN	4.73%
Sibanye-Stillwater	NYSE: SBGL	3.37%
Iamgold	NYSE: IAG	3.75%
Kirkland Lake Gold	NYSE: KL	4.66%
Yamana Gold	NYSE: AUY	4.16%
New Gold	AMEX: NGD	3.28%
Alamos Gold	NYSE: AGI	3.62%
Osisko Gold Royalties	NYSE: OR	3.68%
Hecla Mining	NYSE: HL	4.14%
Eldorado Gold	NYSE: EGO	3.49%

Adjustments are made quarterly after the close of trading on the third Friday of March, June, September, and December so that each component stock represents its assigned weight in the index.

== HUI-gold ratio ==
The HUI-gold ratio is an expression which compares the relative quantities of the NYSE Gold BUGS Index and the price of gold. The ratio is calculated by dividing the value of the NYSE Gold BUGS Index by the price of gold.

Investors use the HUI-gold ratio to illustrate the ever-shifting relative strength of the gold stocks versus gold.

== See also ==
- World Gold Council
- Gold as an investment
