= All Ordinaries =

Australian stock market index

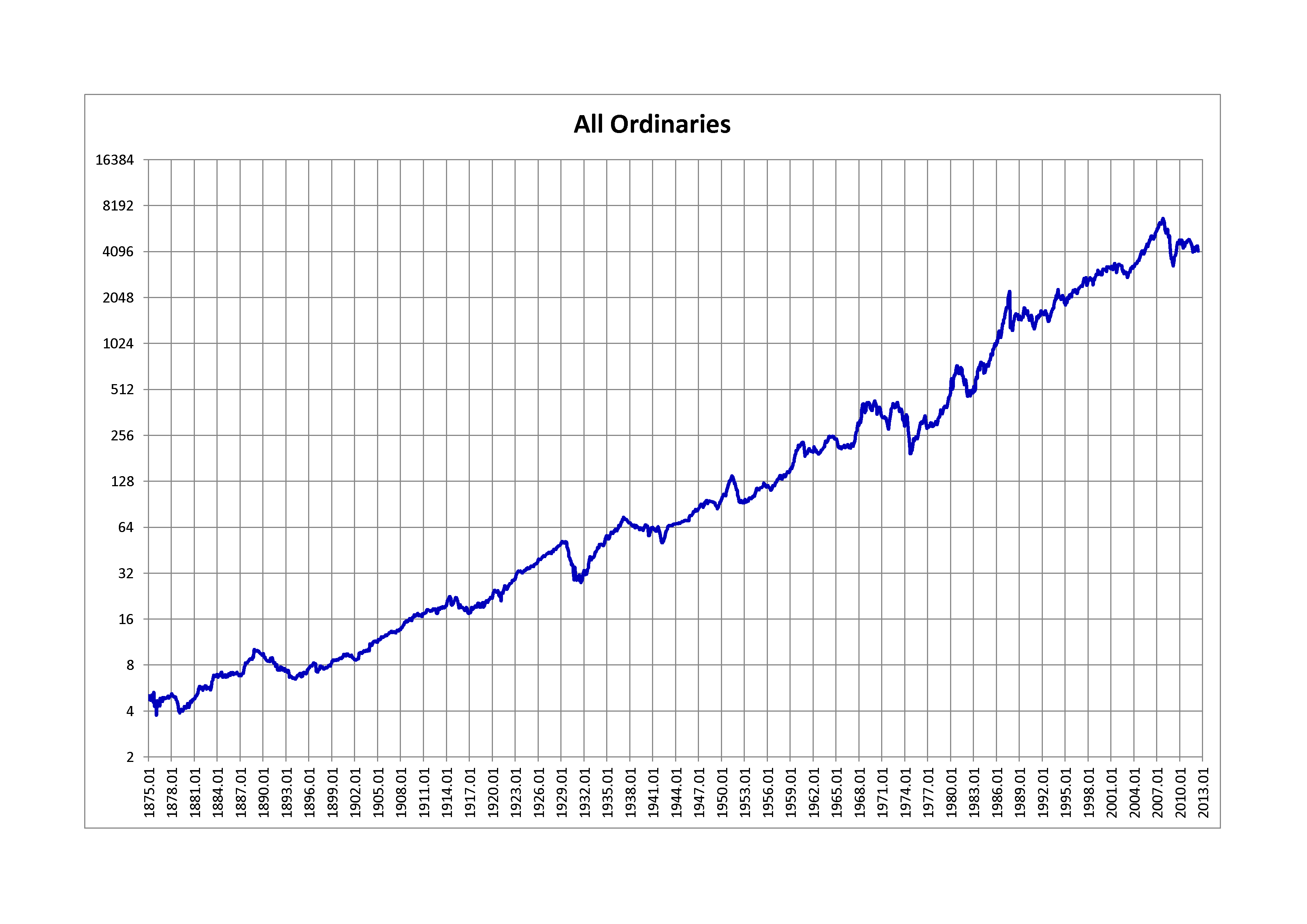
- All Ordinaries 1875–2012 (calculated values before 1980)
- Foundation: 1 January 1980; 46 years ago
- Operator: S&P Dow Jones Indices
- Exchanges: Australian Securities Exchange (ASX)
- Trading symbol: ASX: XAO
- Constituents: 497 (May 2024)
- Type: All except micro-cap
- Market cap: A$2.627 trillion (May 2024)
- Weighting method: Market value weighted
- Related indices: S&P/ASX 20; S&P/ASX 50; S&P/ASX 200; S&P/ASX 300
- Website: All Ordinaries
- Reuters: .AORD
- Bloomberg: AS30

The All Ordinaries (XAO) (colloquially known as the All Ords; also known as the All Ordinaries Index, AOI) is the oldest index of shares in Australia. Established in January 1980, it is made up of the share prices for 500 of the largest companies listed on the Australian Securities Exchange (ASX). The market capitalisation of the companies included in the All Ords index amounts to over 95% of the value of all shares listed on the ASX. The 3-letter exchange ticker in Australia for the All Ordinaries is "XAO". ASX indices are managed by S&P Dow Jones Indices.

== History ==
When established, the All Ords had a base index of 500; this means that if the index is currently at 5000 points, the nominal value of stocks in the All Ords in Australian dollars has increased tenfold since January 1980.

On 3 April 2000, the All Ords was restructured to consist of the 500 largest companies by market capitalisation. This coincided with the introduction of new benchmark indices such as the S&P/ASX 200. The importance of the All Ords has been significantly lessened by the introduction of these new indices.

- On 31 October 2007, the index was at 6,873.20, its highest value prior to the 2008 financial crisis.
- As of 22 January 2008, it had fallen to 5,222.0 points due to turmoil related to the subprime mortgage crisis, a 24% fall.
- On 6 March 2009, it was at a low of 3,111.7 points, during a worldwide drop in stock values, 54% less than the 1 November 2007 high.
- As of 14 September 2009, the index had rebounded to 4,568.5 points, representing a 46.8% increase from the 6 March 2009 low.
- On 5 August 2011, the index fell to 4159 points, with a 4.6% fall in one day, the biggest fall since the subprime mortgage crisis.
- On 13 February 2013, the index rose by 28.4 (0.59%) to 5,010.30, passing 5,000 for the first time since the 2008 financial crisis.
- On 1 November 2017, the index rose to 6,005.50, passing 6,000 points for the first time since the 2008 financial crisis.
- On 10 January 2020, the index closed above 7,000 points for the first time.
- On 1 March 2024, the index closed above 8,000 points for the first time.
- On 14 February 2025, the index achieved a record close of 8,825.10, following an all-time intra-day high of 8,882.70.
- On 16 October 2025, the index closed above 9,000 points for the first time at 9068.40.

=== Annual returns ===
The following table shows the annual development of the All Ordinaries since 1963.

Year	Closing level	Change in index in points	Change in index in %
1963	244.80		
1964	247.90	3.10	1.27
1965	217.20	−30.70	−12.38
1966	224.90	7.70	3.55
1967	301.60	76.70	34.10
1968	405.50	103.90	34.45
1969	441.80	36.30	8.95
1970	348.70	−93.10	−21.07
1971	340.80	−7.90	−2.27
1972	408.60	67.80	19.89
1973	297.50	−111.10	−27.19
1974	201.60	−95.90	−32.24
1975	299.30	97.70	48.53
1976	291.40	−7.90	−2.64
1977	322.30	30.90	10.60
1978	366.10	43.80	13.59
1979	500.00	133.90	36.57
1980	713.50	213.50	42.70
1981	595.50	−118.00	−16.54
1982	485.40	−110.10	−18.49
1983	775.30	289.90	59.72
1984	726.10	−49.20	−6.35
1985	1,003.80	277.70	38.25
1986	1,473.10	469.30	46.75
1987	1,320.00	−153.10	−10.39
1988	1,487.40	167.40	12.68
1989	1,649.00	161.60	10.86
1990	1,279.80	−369.20	−22.39
1991	1,651.40	371.60	29.04
1992	1,549.90	−101.50	−6.15
1993	2,173.60	623.70	40.24
1994	1,932.80	−240.80	−11.08
1995	2,203.00	270.20	13.98
1996	2,424.60	221.60	10.06
1997	2,616.50	191.90	7.91
1998	2,813.40	196.90	7.53
1999	3,152.50	339.10	12.05
2000	3,154.70	2.20	0.07
2001	3,359.90	205.20	6.50
2002	2,975.50	−384.40	−11.44
2003	3,306.00	330.50	11.11
2004	4,053.10	747.10	22.60
2005	4,708.80	655.70	16.18
2006	5,644.30	935.50	19.87
2007	6,421.00	776.70	13.76
2008	3,659.30	−2,761.70	−43.01
2009	4,882.71	1,223.41	33.43
2010	4,846.88	−35.83	−0.73
2011	4,111.04	−735.84	−15.18
2012	4,664.60	553.56	13.47
2013	5,353.10	688.50	14.76
2014	5,388.60	35.50	0.66
2015	5,344.60	−44.00	−0.82
2016	5,719.10	374.50	7.01
2017	6,167.30	448.20	7.84
2018	5,709.40	−457.90	−7.42
2019	6,802.40	1,093.00	19.14
2020	6,850.60	48.20	0.71
2021	7,779.20	928.60	13.56
2022	7,221.70	−557.5	−7.17
2023	7,829.50	607.8	8.33
2024	8,420.50	591	7.55
2025	9,018.80	598.3	7.1

== See also ==
- S&P/ASX 20
- S&P/ASX 50
- S&P/ASX 200
- S&P/ASX 300
