= FTSE Bursa Malaysia Index =

The FTSE Bursa Malaysia Index is a comprehensive range of real-time indices, which cover all eligible companies listed on the Bursa Malaysia Main Board which was introduced to Bursa Malaysia's investors in 2006.

The indices are to measure the performance of the major capital segments of the Malaysian market,

== History ==
The FTSE Bursa Malaysia Index was launched on 26 June 2006 except for FTSE Bursa Malaysia Hijrah Shariah Index and FTSE Bursa Malaysia EMAS Shariah Index which were launched on 22 January 2007 and 21 May 2007 respectively. The launch of the FTSE Bursa Malaysia Hijrah Shariah Index and FTSE Bursa Malaysia EMAS Shariah Index was in response to increasing interest in Shariah-compliant investment. Both index were the joint initiative between FTSE, Bursa Malaysia and the leading global Shariah consultancy, Yasaar Ltd.

=== Tradable Indices ===
- FTSE Bursa Malaysia Large 30 Index
- FTSE Bursa Malaysia Mid 70 Index
- FTSE Bursa Malaysia 100 Index
- FTSE Bursa Malaysia Hijrah Shariah Index

=== Benchmark Indices ===
- FTSE Bursa Malaysia Small Cap Index
- FTSE Bursa Malaysia EMAS Index
- FTSE Bursa Malaysia Fledgling Index
- FTSE Bursa Malaysia EMAS Shariah Index

== Index calculations and currencies ==
The tradable indices are calculated every 15 seconds and the benchmark indices are calculated every 60 seconds. At the end of each day, another calculation will be done. The indices are available at 19:00 Malaysia time (GMT +8) and 11:00 London time GMT via FTP and email.

The currencies involved in trading are Ringgit Malaysia, Sterling, Japanese yen, United States dollar and Euro.

== See also ==
- FTSE Group
- Bursa Malaysia
- Kuala Lumpur Composite Index
