= UBS 100 Index =

The UBS 100 Index is a Swiss share index launched in April 1987. It tracks the 100 Swiss companies with the largest market capitalizations that are listed on the SIX Swiss stock exchange. In 2022, the UBS 100 Index covered 98% of the publicly traded shares of Swiss companies, measured by free-float market capitalization.

In April 1987, the UBS 100 Index began at 100 points. On 16 September 2022, the index registered at 640 points, and the three largest constituents (Nestlé, Novartis and Roche) made up 48.83% of the assets of an ETF that tracks the index.
