= ERS10 =

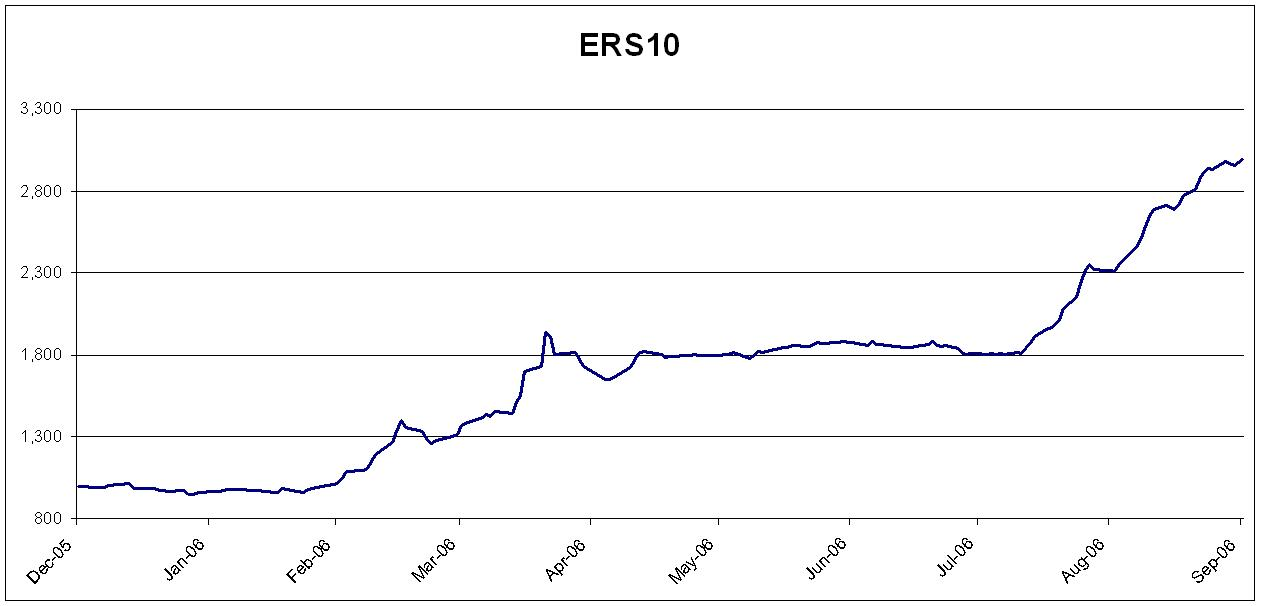
ERS10 index movement between 2005 and 2006

The ERS10 Index is a Bosnian share index of the 10 biggest companies from the power utility sector that are listed on the Banja Luka Stock Exchange (BLSE). The Index was established on 29 December 2005. ERS10 stands for Indeks preduzeća iz sistema Elektroprivrede Republike Srpske, which is Serbian for The Index of the Power Utility Companies of Republika Srpska.

All of the companies listed on this index include the abbreviation a.d. (akcionarsko drušvo) at the end of their name, indicating their status of a public limited company. Other indices on the Banja Luka Stock Exchange are the BIRS (an index of 12 leading shares) and FIRS (an index of 13 privatisation-investment funds).

== History ==
The Index was established on 29 December 2005 and started calculating from January 1, 2006.

The highest value of the index to 7 September 2006, was on that day, at 2642.95.

== List of ERS10 companies ==
Below is the list of the 10 ERS10 companies on 30 August 2006.

- Elektrodistribucija a.d. Pale
- Elektrokrajina a.d. Banja Luka
- Elektrohercegovina a.d. Trebinje
- Elektro-Bijeljina a.d. Bijeljina
- Elektro Doboj a.d. Doboj
- Hidroelektrane na Drini a.d. Višegrad
- Hidroelektrane na Vrbasu a.d. Mrkonjić Grad
- Hidroelektrane na Trebišnjici a.d. Trebinje
- Rudnik i Termoelektrana Gacko a.d. Gacko
- Rudnik i Termoelektrana Ugljevik a.d. Ugljevik

== See also ==
- Republika Srpska Securities Commission
