= NYSE Arca Major Market Index =

Stock market index

The NYSE Arca Major Market Index (or XMI or MMI), previously the AMEX Major Market Index, is the American price-weighted stock market index made up of 20 Blue Chip industrial stocks of major U.S. corporations. Several of the stocks are also components of the Dow Jones Industrial Average (DJIA).

Despite the name none of the stocks that make up the index are listed on NYSE Arca exchange, instead all but one (Microsoft Corporation) are listed on the NYSE. The index was established April 29, 1983; the base price on that date was set at 200.00 with a base value of 200.00

Futures on the XMI Index are traded on the Chicago Board of Trade. Options on the index are traded on Amex, and on Euronext.

== XMI components ==
| Symbol | Company |
|---|---|
| AXP | American Express Company |
| BA | The Boeing Company |
| CVX | Chevron Corporation |
| DD | E. I. du Pont de Nemours and Company |
| DIS | The Walt Disney Company |
| DOW | The Dow Chemical Company |
| GE | General Electric Company |
| HPQ | Hewlett-Packard Company |
| IBM | International Business Machines Corporation |
| JNJ | Johnson & Johnson |
| JPM | JPMorgan Chase & Co. |
| KO | The Coca-Cola Company |
| MCD | McDonald's Corp. |
| MMM | 3M Company |
| MRK | Merck & Co. Inc. |
| MSFT | Microsoft Corporation |
| PG | The Procter & Gamble Company |
| WFC | Wells Fargo & Company |
| WMT | Wal-Mart Stores Inc. |
| XOM | Exxon Mobil Corporation |
