= Russell Midcap Index =

US mid-cap stock market index

- Foundation: November 1, 1991; 34 years ago
- Operator: FTSE Russell
- Exchanges: New York Stock Exchange; Nasdaq
- Trading symbol: ^RMCC
- Constituents: 800
- Type: Mid cap
- Weighting method: Free-float capitalization-weighted
- Related indices: Russell 1000 Index; Russell Indexes
- Website: www.lseg.com/en/ftse-russell/indices/russell-us

Approximate composition of the Russell 1000's market cap, as of April 30, 2025
1. Russell Top 200 Index (78%)
2. Russell Midcap Index (22%)

The Russell Midcap Index is a stock market index that measures performance of the 800 smallest companies (approximately 27% of total capitalization) in the Russell 1000 Index.

As of 30 November 2022, the stocks of the Russell Midcap Index had a weighted average market capitalization of approximately $22.64 billion, median market capitalization of $9.91 billion, and the market capitalization of the largest company is $54.74 billion.

The index, which was launched on November 1, 1991, was created by Russell Investments and is maintained by FTSE Russell, a subsidiary of the London Stock Exchange Group. Its ticker symbol is ^RMCC.

== Investing ==
The Russell Midcap Index is tracked by an ETF, iShares Russell Mid-Cap (NYSE Arca: IWR).

== Top 10 holdings ==
As of June 30, 2019

- ServiceNow (NYSE: NOW)
- Analog Devices (Nasdaq: ADI)
- Fidelity National Information Services (NYSE: FIS)
- Edwards Lifesciences (NYSE: EW)
- Sempra Energy (NYSE: SRE)
- Roper Technologies (NYSE: ROP)
- Worldpay, Inc. (NYSE: WP)
- Fiserv (Nasdaq: FISV)
- Ross Stores (Nasdaq: ROST)
- Dollar General (NYSE: DG)

== See also ==
- S&P 400 – American mid-cap stock market index
- Russell 2000 Index – U.S. small-cap stock market index
- Russell 1000 Index – U.S. large-cap stock market index
