= Ken McKenzie (disambiguation) =

Ken McKenzie (1923–2003) was a Canadian newspaper publisher and sports journalist.

Ken McKenzie or Ken MacKenzie may also refer to:

- Ken MacKenzie (baseball) (1934–2023), Canadian Major League Baseball pitcher
- Ken MacKenzie (businessman) (born 1964), Canadian-born businessman and Chairman of BHP
- Ken McKenzie (footballer, born 1865) (1865–1917), Australian rules footballer for Port Adelaide
- Ken McKenzie (footballer, born 1887) (1887–1958), Australian rules footballer for St Kilda
- Ken McKenzie (rugby league) (1926–1998), Australian rugby league player
- Ken McKenzie (basketball), Canadian basketball player in the 1970s

== See also ==
- Kenneth Mackenzie (disambiguation)
