= Hamish McLennan =

Australian businessman (born 1966)

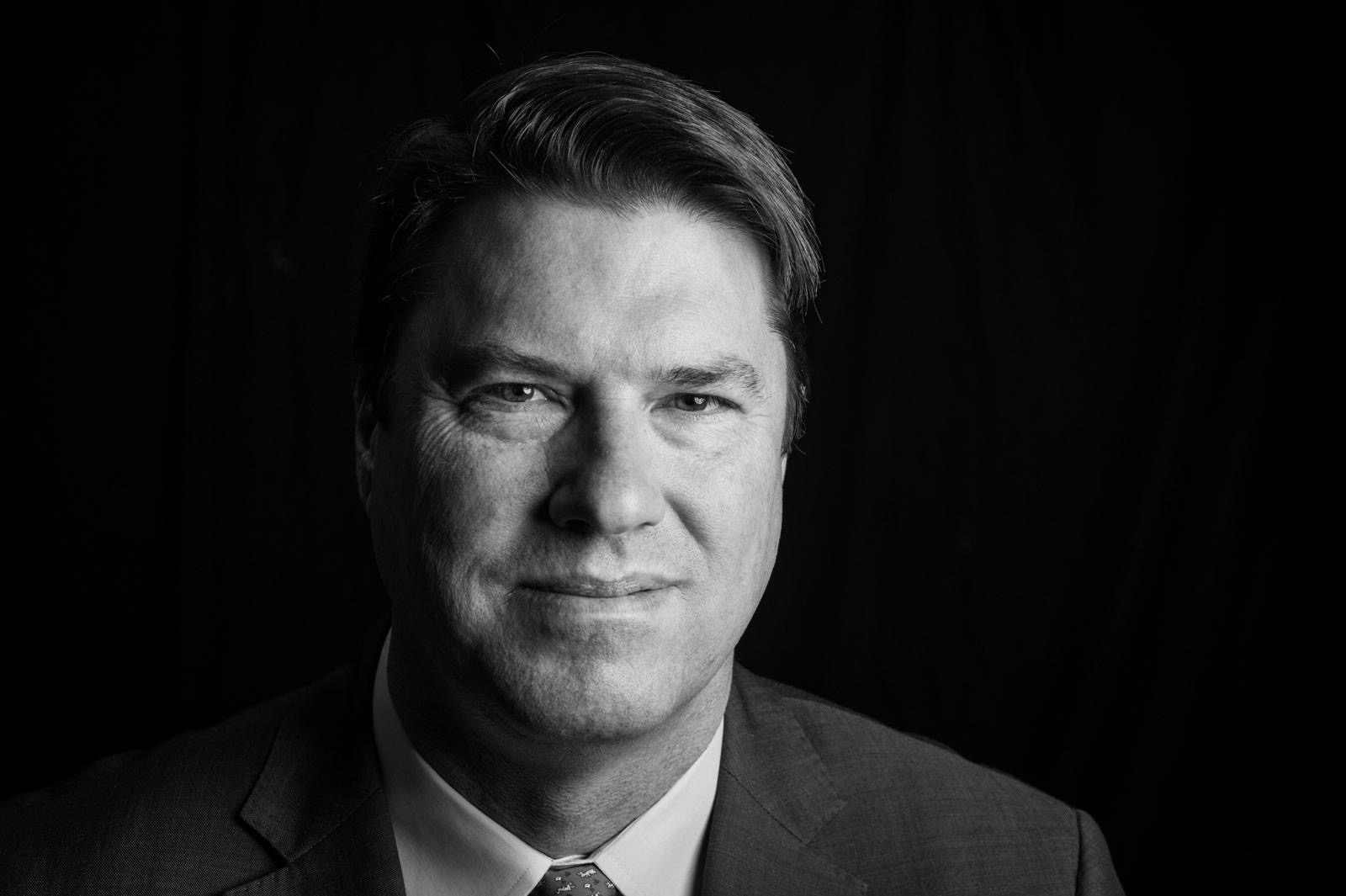
- Born: 13 June 1966 (age 60); Sydney, Australia
- Occupations: Chair of REA Group; Chair of Magellan Financial Group; Chair of ARN Media
- Known for: Network 10 CEO; Executive vice president, Office of the Chairman, News Corporation; Chair of Young & Rubicam; Chairman Rugby Australia

Hamish McLennan (born 13 June 1966) is an Australian businessman who chairs several large, listed companies on the Australian Securities Exchange. He is chair of REA Group, a multibillion-dollar global digital advertising real estate company operated by News Corporation. He is the chairman of Magellan Financial Group, a globally focused equity fund. He is additionally the Chairman of ARN Media. He is a director at Claim Central Consolidated, a global claims business. From May 2020 until November 2023, McLennan served as chairman of Rugby Australia.

McLennan was previously executive vice president, Office of the chairman, News Corporation. Before this he was chair of Young & Rubicam, the largest division of Y&R Brands, owned by WPP, the world's largest marketing and advertising services group. Former corporate roles also include chief executive officer and managing director of free-to-air television network Ten Network Holdings.

== Career ==
McLennan attended Sydney Church of England Grammar School in Sydney. He began his advertising career in Sydney, working for the George Patterson Bates firm, and there he pursued a career in Account Management. In 1994, he moved to Bates Hong Kong as the International Client Services Director. He relocated to that agency's Sydney office before being appointed (at age 32) as the managing director of George Patterson Bates Melbourne, and in 1999 he was named National Managing Director.

In 2002, he moved to Young & Rubicam as chairman and CEO of Young & Rubicam Australia/New Zealand. The agency embarked on a drive that saw it lead all agencies for two consecutive years in terms of new business revenue conversion. At the same time, it claimed a number of Cannes Grand Prix awards and built a market-leading digital practice upon their new client Telstra – Australia's largest telecommunications carrier. He then led the acquisition of his former agency to form George Patterson Y&R, the marketing communications group. In 2006, WPP's founder Martin Sorrell appointed him chairman and CEO of Young & Rubicam globally. Under his leadership, the firm won global clients like LG, Bacardi, Dell, Goldman Sachs and Virgin Atlantic.

For more than a year McLennan worked with News Corporation executive chair Rupert Murdoch as executive vice president, Office of the chairman, News Corporation. In March 2013 McLennan was appointed as CEO and managing director of Ten Network Holdings, replacing James Warburton. McLennan reshaped the audience strategy and revitalized the network's fortunes by implementing new sports and reality TV programming. In 2015, he left Ten Network Holdings ahead of a corporate transaction. In 2018, McLennan acquired a number of data and digital businesses at REA Group. In 2019, he was named Chairman of HT&E, operator of ARN, Australia's leading radio network. In June 2019, he was named deputy chair of Magellan Financial Group, at firm in Australia with $104 billion under management. He became chairman of Magellan in February 2022.

In 2020, McLennan joined the board of gambling company Light & Wonder. In April 2026, McLennan was named the incoming chairman of DroneShield, an Australian counter-drone technology company.

== Rugby Australia ==
In May 2020, it was announced that McLennan would join the board of Rugby Australia and would assume the role of chair. In November 2021, under McLennan's guidance, Australia was named the preferred host for the 2027 Rugby World Cup.

In June 2022, New Zealand news website Stuff described McLennan as the "pantomime villain who understands where NZ Rugby's faultlines lie", amid heightened tensions between NZ Rugby and RA. "McLennan has a singular focus on getting the best financial return for Rugby Australia. That’s it – that’s the game," according to the article. "He can be charming, erudite and interesting, but there is clearly a huge drive to win that means some people get run over along the way. For a NZ Rugby that is starting to find its feet but has had a rocky year or two, he’s an adversary they could do without."

In January 2023, with less than eight months until the 2023 Rugby World Cup, McLennan made the call to sack coach Dave Rennie, who still had a year left on his contract, and replace him with recently sacked England coach Eddie Jones. At the World Cup Australia was eliminated in the first round, their worst ever result at a World Cup, and on 29 October 2023 Jones resigned as coach of Australia.

On 29 November 2023, McLennan was sacked as chairman of Rugby Australia. He subsequently resigned from the board, and was replaced by Daniel Herbert.

== Social responsibility ==
McLennan was a board member of the United Negro College Fund, an American philanthropic organization that funds scholarships for black students. He also serves on the board of the Advertising Council, an American non-profit organization that creates and promotes public service announcements.

In 2007, he invited former US vice president Al Gore to the Cannes Lions International Festival of Creativity to rally the industry in the fight against climate change. That same year, Y&R helped Gore build awareness of climate change through the Live Earth Concerts that took place on 7 continents on 7 July 2007.

In 2019, he joined the Garvan Institute of Medical Research Fundraising Board. Garvan has over 600 researchers focussed on biomedical and genomics research. It is one of only three organizations in the world able to sequence the human genome.

== Professional leadership ==
McLennan has been a participant at the World Economic Forum in Davos, Switzerland, where he has served on panels, ranging from the future of the automotive industry to innovation. He also participated in the Davos Reverse Mentoring Programme, designed to increase the visibility of female employees in media companies.

Since 2007, he has curated seminars at the Cannes Lions International Festival of Creativity.
