= S&P/ASX 200 =

Australian stock market index

- Foundation: April 3, 2000; 26 years ago
- Operator: S&P Dow Jones Indices
- Exchanges: Australian Securities Exchange (ASX)
- Trading symbol: ASX: XJO
- Constituents: 200
- Type: All except micro-cap
- Market cap: A$2.452 trillion (May 2024)
- Weighting method: Float-adjusted market cap weighted
- Related indices: S&P/ASX 20; S&P/ASX 50; S&P/ASX 300; All Ordinaries
- Website: S&P/ASX 200
- Reuters: .AXJO
- Bloomberg: AS51

The S&P/ASX 200 (XJO) index is a market-capitalisation weighted and float-adjusted stock market index of stocks listed on the Australian Securities Exchange. The index is maintained by Standard & Poor's and is considered the benchmark for Australian equity performance. It is based on the 200 largest ASX listed stocks, which together account for about 82% (as of March 2017) of Australia's share market capitalisation.

The ASX 200 was started on 31 March 2000 with a value of 3133.3, equal to the value of the All Ordinaries at that date. The ASX 200 reached 6,000 points for the first time on Thursday 15 February 2007. On 22 December 2017, the ASX 200 was 6,069. The ASX 200 crossed the 7,000 points level for the first time on 16 January 2020.

Bloomberg, CNBC, Yahoo! Finance and Wikinvest use respectively the symbols AS51 .AXJO ^AXJO and AXJO to refer to this index.

The ASX 200 webpage offers a Share market game as an educational tool with $50,000.00 AUD virtual cash.

== Calculations ==
The ASX 200 is capitalisation-weighted, meaning a company's contribution to the index is relative to its total market value i.e., share price multiplied by the number of tradeable shares. The ASX 200 is also float adjusted, meaning the absolute numerical contribution to the index is relative to the stock's value at the float of the stock.

Although the calculation starts with a sum of the market capitalisation of the constituent stocks, it is intended to reflect changes in share price, not market capitalisation. Therefore, a fudge factor called the "Divisor" is used to ensure that the index value only changes when stock prices change, not whenever market capitalisation changes. For example, if a company increases its market capitalisation by issuing and selling new shares to raise capital, the Divisor is adjusted so that the ASX 200 index value does not change.

== Contract specifications ==
The ASX 200 (ticker symbol AP) is traded on the ASX 24 exchange (SFE) with a contract size of 25 x S&P/ASX Index Points.

Contract Specification
Australian 200 (AP)	
Contract Size:	25 X S&P/ASX 200 Index Points
Exchange:	SFE
Sector:	Index
Tick Size:	1
Tick Value:	25 AUD
Big Point Value (BPV):	25
Denomination:	AUD
Decimal Place:	0

== Eligibility ==
To be eligible for inclusion in the ASX 200 Index:

- Market capitalisation: A stock's weight in the index is determined by the float-adjusted market capitalisation of the stock. This is a function of current index shares, the latest available stock price and the Investable weight factor (IWF). The IWF represents the float-adjusted portion of a stock's equity capital. Therefore, any strategic holdings that are classified as either corporate, private or government holdings reduce the IWF which, in turn, results in a reduction in the float-adjusted market capital. Shares owned by founders, directors of the company, trusts, venture capitalists and other companies are also excluded. These are also deemed strategic holders and are considered long-term holders of a stock's equity. Any strategic shareholdings that are greater than 5% of total issued shares are excluded from the relevant float.
- Liquidity: The trading volume in terms of dollar value and the number of transactions must exceed at least 0.025% of the sum of all eligible securities' trading volume. To ensure that no single company dominates trading, they are capped at a maximum of 15% for value, volume and transactions.
- Listing: Only stocks listed on the Australian Stock Exchange will be considered for inclusion in any of the S&P/ASX indices.

== Constituent companies ==
The number of companies in the index is dynamic and does not always amount to exactly 200. On average, the index is rebalanced every quarter by Standard & Poor's.

As of 5 April 2026, the constituent stocks of the ASX 200 in alphabetical order by symbol are

Code	Company	Sector	Market Capitalisation (A$)	Headquarters
360	Life360	Information Technology	3,420,074,734	San Mateo, United States
4DX	4DMedical	Healthcare	3,318,719,295	Melbourne
A2M	a2 Milk Company	Consumer Staples	6,811,751,962	Auckland, New Zealand
AAI	Alcoa	Materials	3,915,655,069	Pittsburgh, United States
AFI	Australian Foundation Investment Company	Financials	8,219,797,877	Melbourne
AGL	AGL Energy	Utilities	6,673,652,551	Sydney
AIA	Auckland International Airport Limited	Industrials	11,372,720,565	Auckland, New Zealand
ALD	Ampol	Energy	7,928,310,834	Sydney
ALK	Alkane Resources	Materials	2,035,645,183	Perth
ALL	Aristocrat Leisure	Consumer Discretionary	27,997,036,412	Sydney
ALQ	ALS	Industrials	10,633,016,485	Brisbane
ALX	Atlas Arteria	Industrials	6,152,364,419	Bermuda, United Kingdom
AMC	Amcor	Materials	8,401,093,541	Warmley, United Kingdom
AMP	AMP	Financials	3,253,285,693	Sydney
ANN	Ansell	Healthcare	4,074,959,389	Melbourne
ANZ	Australia & New Zealand Banking Group	Financials	110,410,102,996	Melbourne
APA	APA Group	Utilities	13,052,188,932	Sydney
APE	Eagers Automotive	Consumer Discretionary	6,689,211,167	Brisbane
ARB	ARB Corporation	Consumer Discretionary	1,675,785,496	Melbourne
ARG	Argo Investments	Financials	6,457,586,317	Adelaide
ASB	Austal	Industrials	1,907,666,999	Perth
ASK	Abacus Storage King	Real Estate	1,754,327,454	Sydney
ASX	ASX	Financials	10,311,777,732	Sydney
AUB	AUB Group	Financials	3,124,921,167	Sydney
AZJ	Aurizon	Industrials	6,834,227,569	Brisbane
BEN	Bendigo & Adelaide Bank	Financials	5,860,403,299	Bendigo
BFL	BSP Financial Group	Financials	3,714,398,833	Port Moresby, Papua New Guinea
BGA	Bega Cheese	Consumer Staples	1,838,371,924	Bega
BGL	Bellevue Gold	Materials	2,280,703,096	Perth
BHP	BHP	Materials	260,319,697,098	Melbourne
BOQ	Bank of Queensland	Financials	4,497,992,294	Brisbane
BPT	Beach Energy	Energy	2,977,140,421	Adelaide
BRG	Breville Group	Consumer Discretionary	3,893,260,520	Sydney
BSL	BlueScope	Materials	11,420,678,626	Melbourne
BWP	BWP Trust	Real Estate	2,630,779,541	Perth
BXB	Brambles	Industrials	30,843,257,058	Sydney
CAR	CAR Group	Communication Services	8,530,972,785	Melbourne
CBA	Commonwealth Bank	Financials	289,174,295,462	Sydney
CDA	Codan	Information Technology	5,823,647,746	Adelaide
CEN	Contact Energy	Utilities	4,101,812,576	Wellington, New Zealand
CGF	Challenger	Financials	5,713,123,833	Sydney
CHC	Charter Hall	Real Estate	8,774,098,041	Sydney
CIA	Champion Iron	Materials	2,836,895,325	Sydney
CIP	Centuria Industrial REIT	Real Estate	1,791,993,764	Sydney
CLW	Charter Hall Long WALE REIT	Real Estate	2,397,585,687	Sydney
CMM	Capricorn Metals	Materials	4,997,040,137	Perth
CNU	Chorus	Communication Services	3,392,998,639	Wellington, New Zealand
COH	Cochlear	Healthcare	11,272,116,657	Sydney
COL	Coles Group	Consumer Staples	30,381,905,088	Melbourne
CPU	Computershare	Information Technology	16,385,705,693	Melbourne
CQR	Charter Hall Retail REIT	Real Estate	2,138,924,961	Sydney
CSC	Capstone Copper	Materials	1,918,441,217	Vancouver, Canada
CSL	CSL	Healthcare	67,425,362,418	Melbourne
CTD	Corporate Travel Management	Consumer Discretionary	2,351,454,738	Brisbane
CWY	Cleanaway	Industrials	5,174,674,975	Melbourne
CYL	Catalyst Metals	Materials	1,596,983,449	Perth
DBI	Dalrymple Bay Infrastructure	Industrials	2,488,723,568	Brisbane
DNL	Dyno Nobel	Materials	5,638,642,963	Brisbane
DOW	Downer Group	Industrials	5,142,022,791	Sydney
DRO	Droneshield	Industrials	3,627,203,981	Sydney
DRR	Deterra Royalties	Materials	2,133,709,719	Perth
DXS	Dexus	Real Estate	6,263,925,390	Sydney
DYL	Deep Yellow	Energy	1,746,201,181	Perth
EBO	EBOS Group	Healthcare	3,975,010,981	Christchurch, New Zealand
EDV	Endeavour Group	Consumer Staples	5,746,322,154	Sydney
EMR	Emerald Resources	Materials	3,739,255,477	Perth
EOS	Electro Optic Systems Holdings	Industrials	1,736,568,891	Canberra
EVN	Evolution Mining	Materials	26,438,690,172	Sydney
EVT	EVT	Communication Services	2,143,670,746	Sydney
FBU	Fletcher Building	Industrials	2,536,757,798	Auckland, New Zealand
FLT	Flight Centre Travel Group	Consumer Discretionary	2,240,454,452	Brisbane
FMG	Fortescue	Materials	62,349,039,590	Perth
FPH	Fisher & Paykel Healthcare	Healthcare	17,793,111,193	Auckland, New Zealand
FRW	Freightways Group	Industrials	1,809,638,065	Auckland, New Zealand
GDG	Generation Development Group	Financials	1,559,678,301	Melbourne
GGP	Greatland Resources	Materials	8,646,848,589	Perth
GMD	Genesis Minerals	Materials	6,705,466,493	Perth
GMG	Goodman Group	Real Estate	53,328,202,379	Sydney
GNE	Genesis Energy	Utilities	2,349,418,103	Auckland, New Zealand
GPT	GPT Group	Real Estate	8,524,319,564	Sydney
GQG	GQG Partners	Financials	5,280,031,942	Fort Lauderdale, United States
HDN	HomeCo Daily Needs REIT	Real Estate	2,517,605,493	Sydney
HUB	HUB24	Financials	6,487,931,467	Sydney
HVN	Harvey Norman	Consumer Discretionary	5,893,611,473	Sydney
IAG	Insurance Australia Group	Financials	17,219,266,180	Sydney
IFL	Insignia Financial	Financials	3,185,949,179	Melbourne
IFT	Infratil	Financials	9,423,516,592	Wellington, New Zealand
IGO	IGO	Materials	6,020,279,113	Perth
ILU	Iluka Resources	Materials	2,910,566,243	Perth
IMD	IMDEX	Materials	1,898,933,156	Perth
JBH	JB Hi-Fi	Consumer Discretionary	7,877,513,331	Melbourne
JHX	James Hardie	Materials	11,802,629,977	Dublin, Ireland
L1G	L1 Group	Financials	2,656,380,786	Melbourne
LLC	Lendlease	Real Estate	2,224,669,616	Sydney
LNW	Light & Wonder	Consumer Discretionary	9,742,092,960	Las Vegas, United States
LOV	Lovisa	Consumer Discretionary	2,325,508,374	Melbourne
LSF	L1 Long Short Fund	Financials	2,509,968,780	Melbourne
LTR	Liontown Resources	Materials	5,388,593,053	Perth
LYC	Lynas Rare Earths	Materials	19,536,215,039	Perth
MCY	Mercury NZ	Utilities	7,353,211,297	Auckland, New Zealand
MEZ	Meridian Energy	Utilities	5,888,081,498	Sydney
MFF	MFF Capital Investments	Financials	2,698,471,967	Wellington, New Zealand
MFG	Magellan Financial Group	Financials	1,770,382,163	Sydney
MGR	Mirvac	Real Estate	6,727,691,670	Sydney
MIN	Mineral Resources	Materials	10,411,244,067	Perth
MND	Monadelphous Group	Industrials	2,807,607,752	Brisbane
MPL	Medibank	Financials	12,227,774,386	Melbourne
MQG	Macquarie Group	Financials	78,358,246,740	Sydney
MSB	Mesoblast	Healthcare	2,748,343,658	Melbourne
MTS	Metcash	Consumer Staples	3,266,186,686	Sydney
MXT	Metrics Master Income Trust	Financials	2,345,186,381	Sydney
NAB	National Australia Bank	Financials	69,797,300,000	Melbourne
NEM	Newmont	Materials	13,530,603,778	Denver, United States
NHC	New Hope	Energy	4,925,291,067	Brisbane
NHF	Nib	Financials	3,122,902,470	Newcastle
NIC	Nickel Industries	Materials	3,951,161,646	Sydney
NSR	National Storage	Real Estate	3,889,245,765	Brisbane
NST	Northern Star Resources	Materials	31,355,916,981	Perth
NWH	NRW Holdings	Industrials	2,467,337,511	Perth
NWL	Netwealth Group	Financials	5,207,233,158	Melbourne
NWS	News Corp Class B	Communication Services	1,706,704,352	New York City, United States
NXG	Nexgen Energy	Energy	2,357,033,627	Vancouver, Canada
NXT	NextDC	Information Technology	7,215,977,531	Sydney
OBM	Ora Banda Mining	Materials	2,158,490,678	Perth
ORA	Orora	Materials	2,291,391,034	Melbourne
ORG	Origin Energy	Utilities	21,689,393,178	Sydney
ORI	Orica	Materials	9,410,846,170	Melbourne
PDI	Predictive Discovery	Materials	2,201,094,238	Perth
PDN	Paladin Energy	Energy	5,113,698,831	Perth
PLS	PLS Group	Materials	16,394,887,582	Perth
PME	Pro Medicus	Healthcare	12,415,210,403	Melbourne
PMV	Premier Investments	Consumer Discretionary	1,984,110,775	Melbourne
PNI	Pinnacle Investment Management	Financials	3,153,287,253	Sydney
PPT	Perpetual	Financials	1,825,367,174	Sydney
PRN	Perenti	Materials	1,806,615,024	Perth
PRU	Perseus Mining	Materials	7,118,819,020	Perth
PXA	Pexa Group	Real Estate	2,127,068,682	Melbourne
QAN	Qantas	Industrials	12,937,853,835	Sydney
QBE	QBE Insurance	Financials	32,363,610,639	Sydney
QUB	Qube Holdings	Industrials	8,763,539,459	Sydney
RDX	Redox	Industrials	1,764,273,598	Sydney
REA	REA Group	Communication Services	20,366,695,985	Melbourne
REG	Regis Healthcare	Healthcare	1,844,405,181	Melbourne
REH	Reece Group	Industrials	8,088,459,235	Melbourne
RGN	Region Group	Real Estate	2,585,750,166	Sydney
RHC	Ramsay Health Care	Healthcare	8,983,896,244	Sydney
RIO	Rio Tinto	Materials	60,093,744,607	Melbourne/London, United Kingdom
RMD	ResMed	Healthcare	18,493,619,517	San Diego, United States
RMS	Ramelius Resources	Materials	7,033,564,139	Perth
RRL	Regis Resources	Materials	5,088,734,777	Perth
RSG	Resolute Mining	Materials	2,981,697,570	Perth
RWC	Reliance Worldwide Corporation	Industrials	2,196,000,147	Melbourne
RYM	Ryman Healthcare	Healthcare	1,889,256,091	Christchurch, New Zealand
S32	South32	Materials	19,830,266,962	Perth
SCG	Scentre Group	Real Estate	17,601,432,797	Sydney
SDF	Steadfast Group	Financials	4,659,244,921	Sydney
SEK	Seek	Communication Services	4,943,927,430	Melbourne
SFR	Sandfire Resources	Materials	7,637,991,719	Perth
SGH	SGH	Industrials	16,552,615,452	Sydney
SGM	Sims Metal	Materials	3,555,487,034	Sydney
SGP	Stockland	Real Estate	10,018,373,783	Sydney
SHL	Sonic Healthcare	Healthcare	9,874,874,301	Sydney
SIG	Sigma Healthcare	Healthcare	30,706,249,544	Melbourne
SMR	Stanmore Resources	Materials	2,334,604,332	Brisbane
SNZ	Summerset Group Holdings	Healthcare	1,808,722,454	Wellington, New Zealand
SOL	Soul Patts	Financials	15,705,879,654	Sydney
SPK	Spark New Zealand	Communication Services	3,269,925,087	Auckland, New Zealand
STO	Santos	Energy	26,242,005,525	Adelaide
SUL	Super Retail Group	Consumer Discretionary	2,877,029,610	Strathpine
SUN	Suncorp	Financials	17,110,887,369	Brisbane
TAH	Tabcorp	Consumer Discretionary	2,132,159,134	Melbourne
TCL	Transurban	Industrials	43,245,747,038	Melbourne
TLC	The Lottery Corporation	Consumer Discretionary	12,019,167,196	Brisbane
TLS	Telstra	Communication Services	60,905,654,189	Melbourne
TLX	Telix Pharmaceuticals	Healthcare	4,388,639,072	Melbourne
TNE	TechnologyOne	Information Technology	8,809,487,438	Brisbane
TPG	TPG Telecom	Communication Services	8,009,159,952	Sydney
TUA	Tuas	Communication Services	3,175,213,830	Sydney
TWE	Treasury Wine Estates	Consumer Staples	3,011,740,980	Melbourne
VAU	Vault Minerals	Materials	4,289,644,572	Perth
VCX	Vicinity Centres	Real Estate	11,044,000,315	Melbourne
VEA	Viva Energy	Energy	4,221,278,806	Melbourne
VGN	Virgin Australia Holdings	Industrials	1,803,733,243	Brisbane
VNT	Ventia Services Group	Industrials	4,300,326,134	Sydney
WAF	West African Resources	Materials	3,701,668,429	Perth
WAM	WAM Capital	Financials	1,913,056,911	Sydney
WBC	Westpac	Financials	136,299,086,704	Sydney
WDS	Woodside Energy Group	Energy	66,405,427,995	Perth
WES	Wesfarmers	Consumer Discretionary	83,209,566,732	Perth
WGX	Westgold Resources	Materials	5,678,437,700	Perth
WHC	Whitehaven Coal	Energy	7,500,938,233	Sydney
WLE	WAM Leaders	Financials	1,886,266,717	Sydney
WOR	Worley	Energy	5,539,089,692	Sydney
WOW	Woolworths Group	Consumer Staples	45,211,386,096	Sydney
WTC	Wisetech Global	Information Technology	12,731,179,354	Sydney
XRO	Xero	Information Technology	12,633,999,232	Wellington, New Zealand
XYX	Block, Inc.	Financials	3,139,539,773	Oakland, United States
YAL	Yancoal Australia	Materials	10,920,034,144	Sydney
ZIM	Zimplats Holdings	Materials	1,878,276,975	Guernsey, United Kingdom
ZIP	Zip	Financials	2,001,326,648	Sydney

== See also ==
- List of Australian exchange-traded funds listed on ASX
- S&P/ASX 20
- S&P/ASX 50
- S&P/ASX 300
- All Ordinaries
