= Kenneth Mackenzie =

Kenneth Mackenzie, Kenneth MacKenzie, or Kenneth McKenzie may refer to:

== Clergy and missionaries ==
- John Kenneth MacKenzie (1850–1888), known as J. Kenneth MacKenzie, British medical missionary in China
- Kenneth Mackenzie (bishop of Argyll and The Isles) (1863–1945), Episcopal bishop in Scotland
- Kenneth Mackenzie (bishop of Brechin) (1876–1966), Episcopal bishop in Scotland
- Kenneth Mackenzie (missionary) (1920–1971), minister of the Church of Scotland and missionary in Central Africa

== Politicians and judges ==
- Kenneth McKenzie (Manitoba politician) (1822–1911), rancher and politician in Manitoba, Canada
- Sir Kenneth Mackenzie, 3rd Baronet (c. 1658 – 1728), British member of parliament for Cromartyshire and Nairnshire
- Kenneth James Muir MacKenzie (1882–1931), British soldier, lawyer, and judge
- Kenneth Mackenzie, Lord Fortrose (1717–1761), British member of parliament for Ross-shire and Inverness Burghs
- Kenneth Muir Mackenzie, 1st Baron Muir Mackenzie (1845–1930), British barrister, civil servant and Labour politician
- Kenneth W. MacKenzie (1862–1929), mayor of Edmonton, Alberta, Canada
- Kenneth Mackenzie, 1st Earl of Seaforth (1744–1781) (of the second creation), British member of parliament for Buteshire and Caithness
- Kenneth Mackenzie (governor) (1751–1831), prominent land owner in the Caribbean and interim governor of Grenada

== Peers and Scottish clan chiefs ==
- Kenneth Mackenzie, 1st Earl of Seaforth (1744–1781) (of the second creation), British member of parliament for Buteshire and Caithness
- Kenneth Mackenzie, 3rd Earl of Seaforth (1635–1678), Highland clan chief and Scottish nobleman
- Kenneth Mackenzie, 4th Earl of Seaforth (1661–1701), Scottish peer and Jacobite supporter
- Kenneth Mackenzie, 1st Lord Mackenzie of Kintail (c. 1569 – 1611), first Lord Mackenzie of Kintail
- Kenneth Mackenzie, 7th of Kintail (died 1492), chief of the Clan Mackenzie
- Kenneth Mackenzie, 8th of Kintail (died c. 1498–1499), Highland chief
- Kenneth Mackenzie, 10th of Kintail (died 1568), chief of the Clan Mackenzie
- Kenneth Mackenzie, Lord Fortrose (1717–1761), British member of parliament for Ross-shire and Inverness Burghs
- Kenneth Muir Mackenzie, 1st Baron Muir Mackenzie (1845–1930), British barrister, civil servant and Labour politician

== Others ==
- Kenneth Mackenzie (author) (1913–1955), Australian poet and novelist
- Kenneth Mackenzie (RAF officer) (1916–2009), British fighter pilot during the Second World War
- Kenneth MacKenzie (baseball) or Ken MacKenzie (born 1934), Canadian Major League Baseball pitcher
- Kenneth MacKenzie (British general) or Kenneth Douglas (1754–1833), British army general and architect of the Shorncliffe Method for Light Infantry training
- Kenneth MacKenzie (businessman) or Ken MacKenzie (born 1964), Canadian-born businessman and Chairman of BHP
- Kenneth McKenzie (footballer, born 1887) or Ken McKenzie (1887–1958), Australian rules footballer
- Kenneth McKenzie (fur trader) (died 1861), fur trader in the upper Missouri River valley
- Kenneth McKenzie (rugby league) or Ken McKenzie (1926–1998), Australian rugby league footballer
- Sir Kenneth Mackenzie, 6th Baronet (1832–1900), British diplomat and landowner
- Kenneth D. Mackenzie (born 1937), American organizational theorist and management consultant
- Kenneth F. McKenzie Jr. (born 1957), US Marine Corps general
- Kenneth Kent Mackenzie (1877–1934), lawyer and amateur botanist
- Kenneth G. McKenzie (1892-1964), Canadian neurosurgeon, inventor of the leucotome
- Kenneth N. MacKenzie (1897–1951), officer in the merchant fleet known for his role in Antarctic research expeditions
- Kenneth R. Mackenzie (1908–1990), British scholar and parliamentary clerk
- Kenneth R. H. Mackenzie (1833–1886), translated the German tale Till Eulenspiegel into English as Master Tyll Owlglass: His Marvellous Adventures and Rare Conceits (1860)
- Kenneth Ross MacKenzie (1912–2002), American physicist and discoverer of astatine
- Kenneth Mackenzie of Suddie (died 1688), Scottish soldier

== See also ==
- Ken McKenzie (disambiguation)
- Kennith McKenzie or Ken McKenzie (1865–1917), Australian rules footballer for Port Adelaide
