= Ian Macoun =

Australian businessman and philanthropist

- Born: Rockhampton, Australia
- Occupation: Businessman
- Known for: Entrepreneurship in financial services, investing, philanthropy
- Spouse: Wendy Macoun

Ian Macoun is as Australian businessman. He is the founder and chief executive of Pinnacle Investment Management Group, a multi-affiliate investment management company publicly listed on the Australian Securities Exchange.

== Career ==
A graduate of the University of Queensland, Macoun worked in Queensland Treasury during the late 1970s and the 1980s. He was First Assistant Under Treasurer, leading the Queensland Government's commercial participation in several major industrial development projects

In 1988, he was appointed the inaugural chief executive of Queensland Investment Corporation. In 1993 he moved to the private sector as managing director (chief executive) of Westpac Investment Management in Sydney, where he led the reconstruction of Westpac's investment business.

In 1998, together with partners, Macoun established Perennial Investment Partners, which at the time was Australia's first multi-affiliate investment management firm. Macoun exited Perennial Partners in 2006 and his equity was purchased by backing shareholder, IOOF.

=== Pinnacle Investment Management Group ===
After leaving Perennial Investment Partners, Macoun founded Pinnacle Investment Management Group, which was based on a similar multi-affiliate model to Perennial. He told media he wanted to start again, “to do it bigger and better".

Macoun launched Pinnacle Investment Management Group in 2006, with seed funding from Wilson HTM Investment Group. Pinnacle was privately owned by Wilson HTM Group and Pinnacle executives, including Macoun, who was executive chairman. Pinnacle became an ASX-listed company in 2016 following a restructuring deal with Wilson HTM Group which saw the listed company renamed Pinnacle Investment Management Group and Macoun appointed Chief Executive of the listed company. At the time, Pinnacle had $19.25 billion in funds under management and accounted for all of Wilson HTM Group's profit in the first half of 2016.

As of September 2025, Pinnacle has A$197.4 billion in funds under management, across 19 affiliated investment managers. The Group which is a constituent of the S&P/ASX 200 remains headquartered in Sydney, Australia, with fund distribution and infrastructure employees, and affiliated investment teams located across five countries.

== Personal life ==
Macoun was born in Rockhampton, Queensland. His father worked for the state railways and his mother worked in the retail sector. He attended North Rockhampton State High School, before completing a Bachelor of Commerce and a master's degree in Financial Management at the University of Queensland. He was awarded the Chartered Financial Analyst (CFA) designation in 2002.

He is married to Wendy Macoun, with whom he has three adult children.

=== Research & Industry Contributions ===
Macoun was a co-author of Sustainable Queensland, a 2007 research project published by the Committee for Economic Development of Australia recommending strategies for the ongoing financing and management of Queensland's infrastructure construction.

Macoun was featured in Hybrid Workplace Hacks: Strategies to Set Up and Lead Successful In-person and Remote Teams, published by Wiley.

In 2024, Macoun was recognised with The Australian Funds Management Industry Contribution Award at the 2024 Zenith Investment Partners Fund Awards.

=== Philanthropy ===
Macoun's family supports Australian medical research and educational scholarship programs, through the Macoun Charitable Foundation and the PNI Foundation (formerly the Pinnacle Charitable Foundation)
