= Veronis Suhler Stevenson =

American private investment firm

VSS
- Type: Privately held company
- Industry: Private Equity
- Founded: 1981; 45 years ago
- Headquarters: 55 East 52nd Street; New York, New York, United States
- Key people: Jeffrey T. Stevenson, David Bainbridge, Morgan Callagy, Trent Hickman, Christopher Russell, Patrick N.W. Turner
- Products: VSS Structured Capital
- Website: www.vss.com

Veronis Suhler Stevenson, known by its initials, VSS, is a private investment firm that invests in the information, business services, healthcare IT, education, media and marketing industries in North America and Europe.

Since 1987, VSS has managed seven private investment funds with aggregate initial capital commitments totaling over $3 billion, including four equity funds and two structured capital funds. To date, VSS funds have invested in 74 platform companies, which have together completed over 330 add-on acquisitions.

VSS has headquarters in New York City, and has offices in London, where it operates as Veronis Suhler Stevenson International Ltd.

== Corporate history ==
The company was founded as Veronis, Suhler & Associates (VS&A) in 1981, by John J. Veronis and John S. Suhler. Veronis cofounded Psychology Today magazine and its associated enterprises, and Suhler was a former president of CBS Publishing Group. Jeffrey T. Stevenson joined the company the following year, and became a named partner in 2001.

Today, the company is a major private capital investment firm specializing in the lower middle market and focusing on the healthcare, education, business services, and related industries.

In 2024, Pinnacle Investment Management Group, an ASX-listed multi-affiliate investment management company, acquired 22.5% of VSS. Concurrent with this investment, Trent Hickman was promoted to Co-Managing Partner alongside Jeffrey Stevenson.

== Investment and buyout activities ==
As of 2025, VSS's portfolio has invested in 103 companies, resulting in over 600 add-ons and acquisition transactions.

Details on current and former platform investments are available on the company's website.

== Recognitions and Awards ==
VSS has received multiple notable industry recognitions, including:

- Private Equity Wire Awards, "Performance of the Year for Mezzanine Debt Over $500 million" for Structured Capital IV, and "Performance of the Year for Mezzanine Debt Under $500 million" for Structured Capital III (2025)
- Inc. Magazine's Founder-Friendly Investors List (2023, 2024, 2025)
- Ranked by PitchBook as #1 in Global Mezzanine, #1 in North America Private Debt, and #2 in Global Private Debt fund categories for 2024
- "Winners Circle 2024" awards at the 6th Annual USA M&A Mid-Market Atlas Award for Outstanding Firm in USA Private Equity - Lower Middle Market and Growth Investment Deal of the Year (2024)
- Axial's 25 Most Active Private Equity Firms (2024)
