= Bullbar =

Vehicle protection equipment

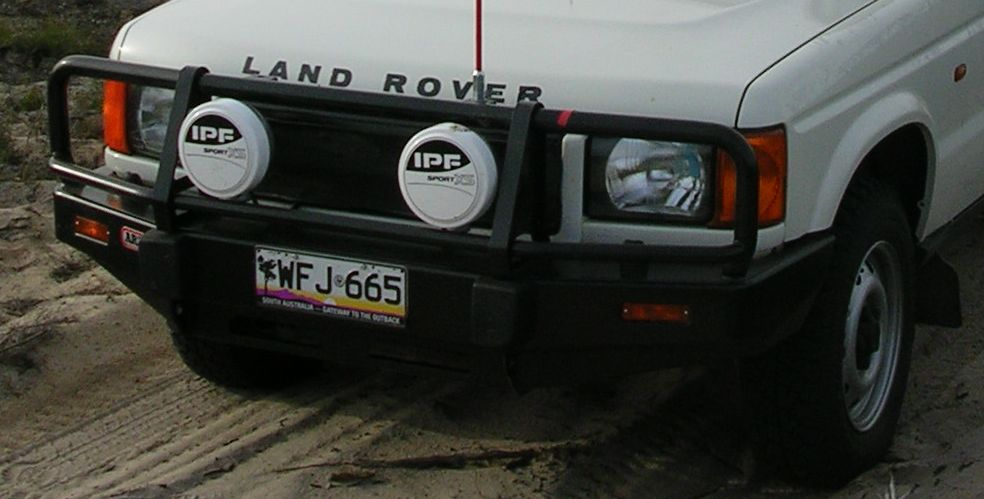
A bullbar on a Land Rover Discovery fitted with spotlights and a sand flag.

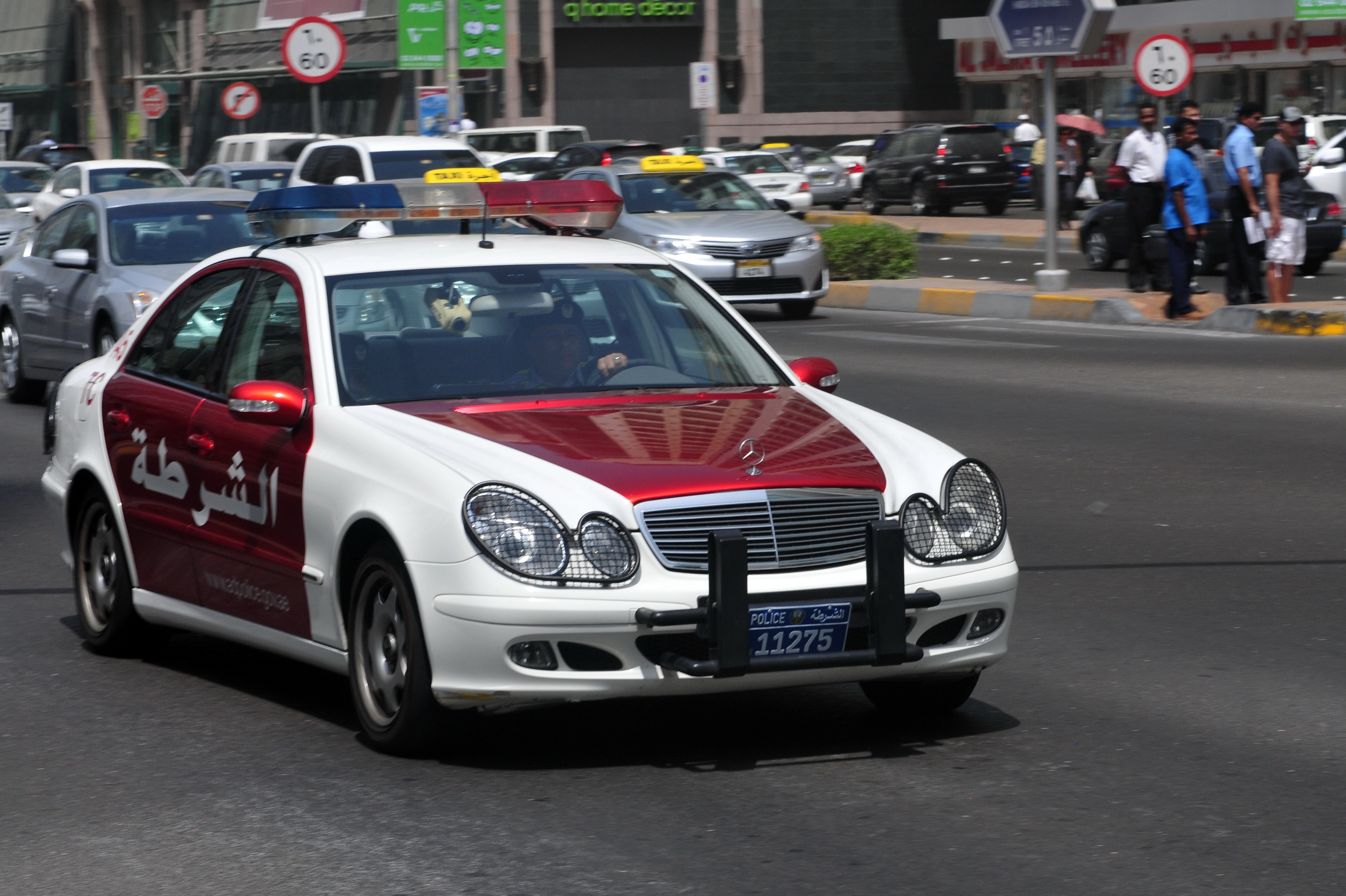
Push bar of a police car in Abu Dhabi, used to move stranded vehicles out of the way

A bullbar or push bumper (Note: also known as a kangaroo bar, roo bar, winch bar, nudge bar, livestock stop (Note: "livestock stop" initially a term used to refer to "cowcatchers", the locomotive pilots), kangaroo device, push bar, ram bar, brush guard, grille guard, moose bumper, cactus pusher, rammer, PIT bar, PIT bumper, or cattle pusher) is a device installed on the front of a vehicle to protect its front from collisions, whether an accidental collision with a large animal in rural roads, or an intentional collision by police with another vehicle. They vary considerably in size and form, and are normally composed of welded steel or aluminium tubing, or, more recently, moulded polycarbonate and polyethylene materials. The "bull" in the name refers to cattle, which in rural areas sometimes roam onto rural roads and highways.

== Safety and legality ==
Studies have shown that using bull bars increases the risk of death and serious injury to pedestrians. This is because the bull bar is rigid, and so transmits all the force to the pedestrian, unlike a bumper which resists some force and crumples. Due to the number of deaths and injuries caused by the rigid fronts of cars, often with metal bullbars (2,000 deaths and 18,000 serious accidents per year in Europe, according to official studies in the UK), the sale of new metal bullbars which did not comply with a European Union Directive was banned in the European Union. However, in the United Kingdom the sale and refitting of second-hand bars manufactured before 2007 or the use of pre-2007 bars already fitted is permitted as per the current MOT guidelines: "It is not illegal for vehicles to be fitted with bull bars, although the Department would not recommend their fitment unless it has been shown, through compliance with specified safety standards, that they do not pose an additional risk of injury to pedestrians or other vulnerable road users. There are no plans for legislation to require bull bars that are already fitted to be removed."

== Design and terminology ==
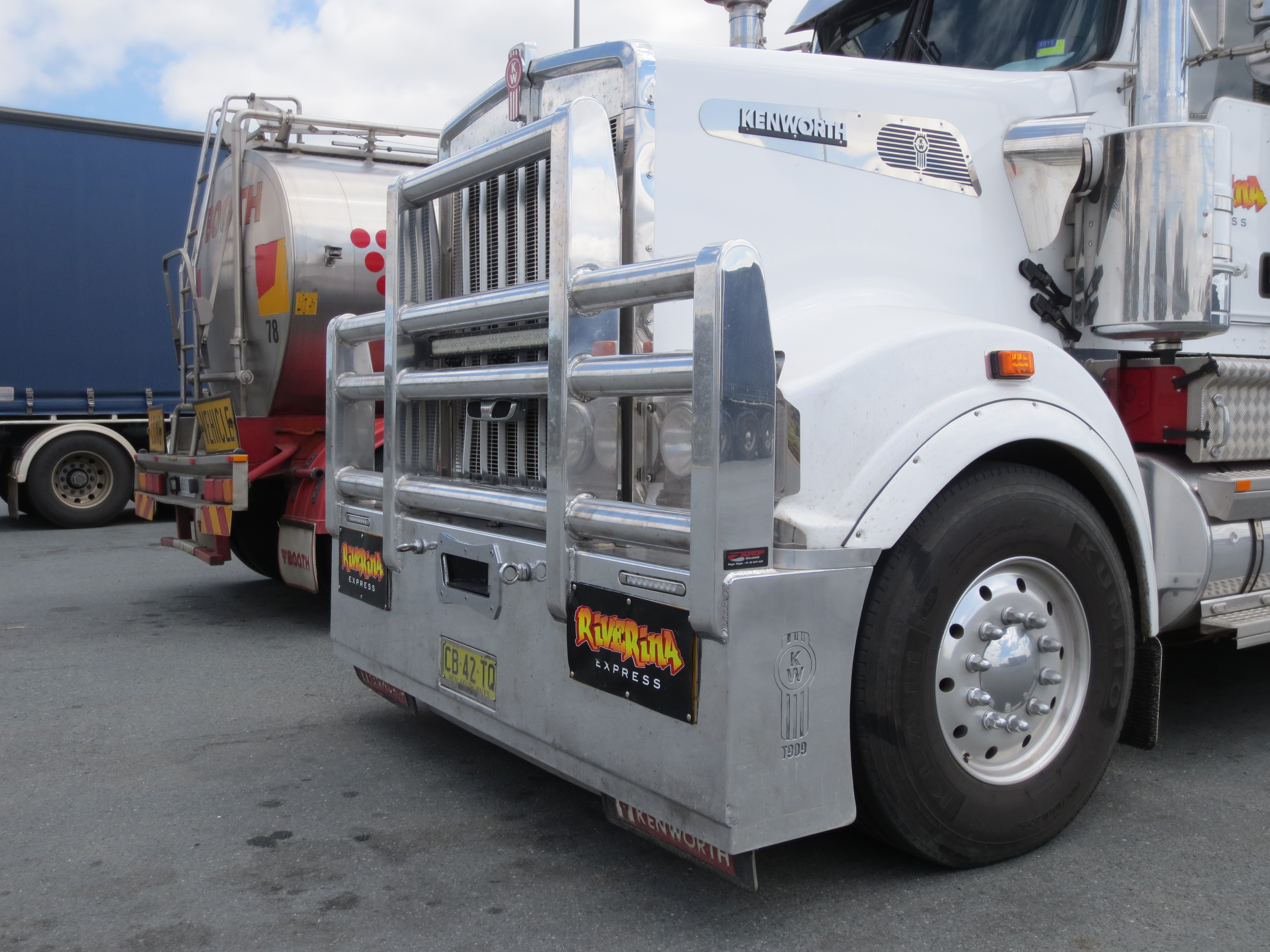
Bull bar on a semi tractor

Where cattle are more prominent and where larger four-wheel drive vehicles are used, drivers use larger steel bullbars.

Brushbars (or bush bars) are similar to bullbars, often integrated into the bull bar design. They protect the front fender panels of the vehicle, especially headlights, from brush and small trees.

"Nudge bars", another kind of bullbar, are generally fitted to sedans and small SUVs, and consist of light aluminium alloy or polycarbonate tubing that protects only the radiator area without replacing the bumper. Bullbars typically replace the front bumper and front inner wheel wells, so most require indicator light housings.

Bullbars are sometimes used as a platform for mounting spotlights, fishrod holders and vehicle recovery winches. Radio antennas for equipment such as CB radios are often mounted onto bullbars, even though mounting on the roof provides better performance. Mounting on the roof is inconvenient in cities as it typically makes vehicles too tall to fit in underground carparks.

Bullbars incorporating a winch are often known as "winch bumpers" (USA) or "winch bars" (AU), especially in the UK where the sale of bullbars that do not meet European standards, as mentioned above, was banned since 2007. However, the legislation was not retrospective, and steel frontal protection systems can still be legal, for instance when incorporating a winch fitting.

As a safety feature, traditional bars are built to protect the vehicle, which is considered less safe than allowing controlled deformation to absorb kinetic energy during a collision. Modern design of bullbars and roo bars has advanced, so some vehicle manufacturers and aftermarket companies now offer impact bars which integrate with the vehicle safety system, such as activation of airbags after collision with the bullbar. Plastic bullbars made from materials such as polyethylene are designed to act like a spring and deflect due to the force of a collision so that the vehicle is still driveable after striking an animal. These designs are more "pedestrian friendly" than the same vehicle without any bullbar. Some modern bullbars have crumple zones and/or are mounted on sliders, designed to move back in order to reduce impact forces.

There are many aspects relating to the proper construction of a bullbar. It is widely accepted that the channel section which provides the strength for the protection system must be constructed from one piece of material and free from sections bolted on or welded together. The thickness of the material is something which should be considered when choosing a bullbar, generally the thicker the material, the stronger the product delivering greater protection. The grade of material is also important, products manufactured from steel or hi-tensile/structural grade alloys are stronger than a standard alloy or polymer products. Bull bars are popular among the SUV and truck owners in the U.S. and installation of a bull bar is not considered a modification, as this is bolt-on accessory. The most popular materials of the US-built bull bars are polished stainless steel and mild steel with black powder coating. Some states require license plate relocation from the body to the bull bar. However, all states allow installation of aftermarket bull bars as of 2018.

In recent times bullbars have become popular also as a cosmetic accessory, particularly on the larger four wheel drive and Sports Utility Vehicles (SUVs). Studies and media attention to them and their role in increasing pedestrian deaths led to an agreement with the European Union among carmakers not to install them on new vehicles from January 1, 2002. This was followed by a full EU ban on the sale of rigid bullbars (e.g., by aftermarket fitters). Vehicles that already had them fitted prior to the ban remain legal.

=== Police usage ===
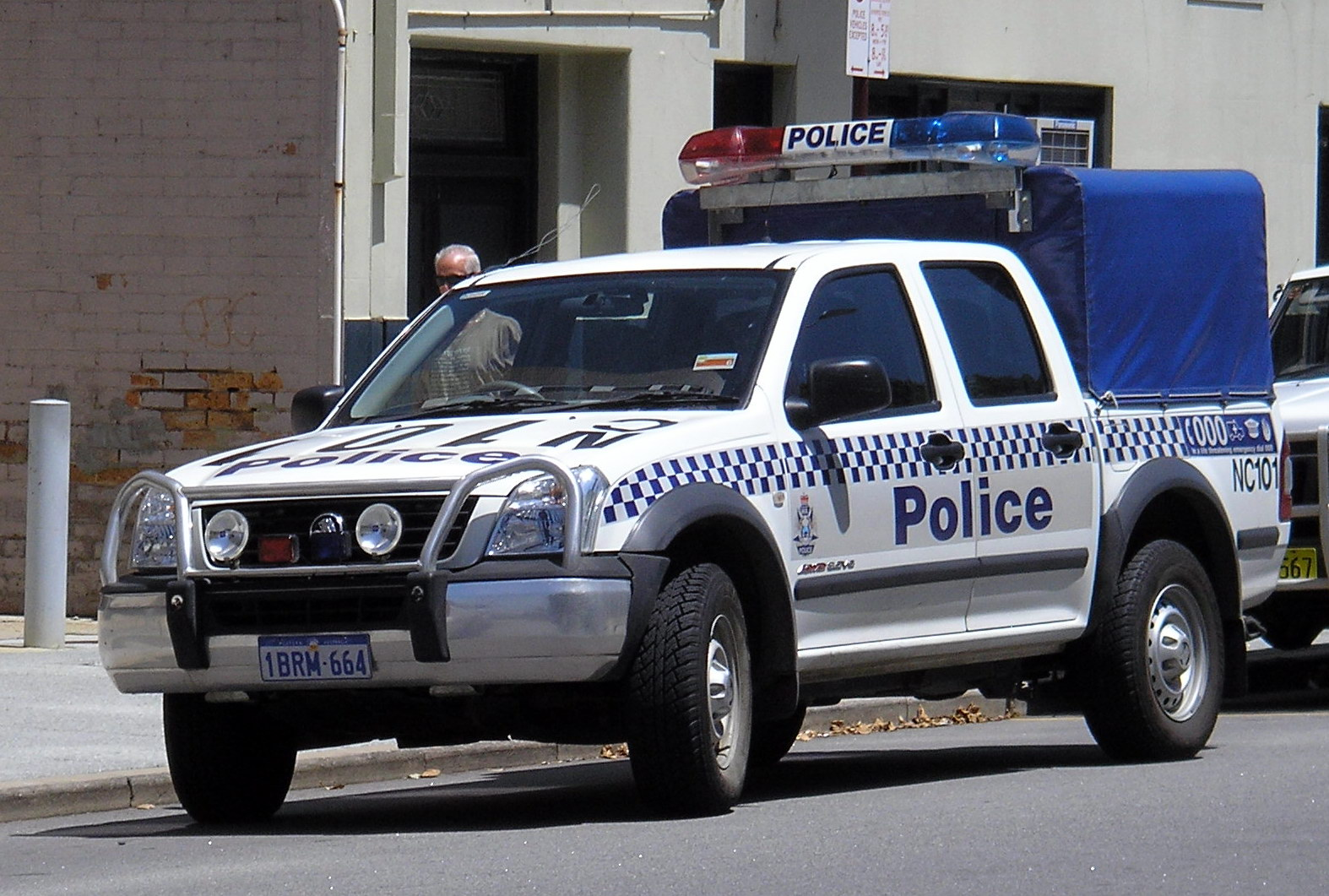
Fully integrated roo bar fitted to a Holden Rodeo ute operated by the Western Australian Police Service

A push bumper or nudge bar is fitted to the chassis of the car and located to augment the front bumper, to allow the car to be used as a battering ram for simple structures or fences, or to push disabled vehicles off the road.

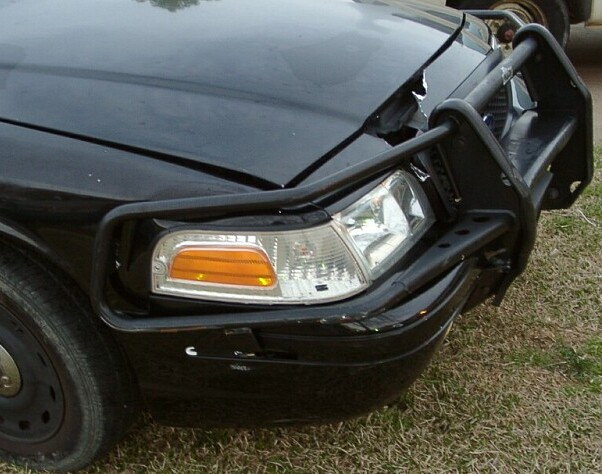
Damage to a PIT bumper on a Ford Crown Victoria Police Interceptor, resulting from its use.

The Pursuit Intervention Technique (PIT) bumper attaches to the front frame of a patrol car. It is designed to end vehicle pursuits by spinning the fleeing vehicle with a nudge to the rear quarter panel. Cars not fitted with a PIT Bumper can still attempt a PIT maneuver at risk of increased front-end damage and possible disablement if the maneuver fails and the pursuit continues.

Bullbars are installed using the same mounting holes in the front of the truck or SUV that are used to install snow plows, tow hooks, and other accessories. Bullbar installation require a set of lower brackets, while installing larger grille guards, such as brushbars, may also require upper mounting brackets. Some bullbars might cover front license plate of the vehicle. In this case special license plate brackets can be used to relocate it and ensure its proper visibility.

For the 2020 Nova Scotia attacks, the perpetrator's replica police cruiser was installed with a bullbar which he used for a head-on collision with an RCMP cruiser.

== Australia ==
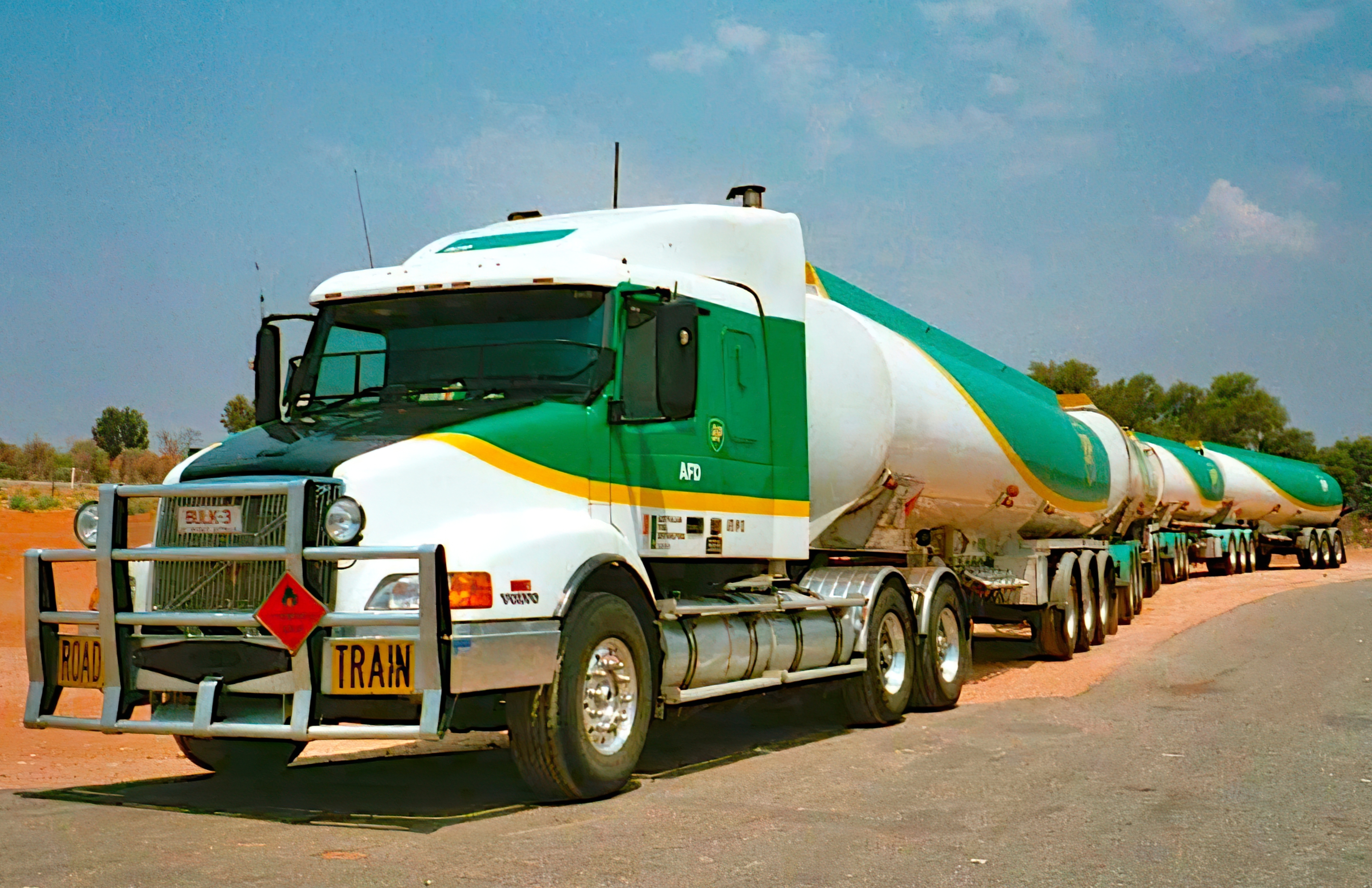
Roo bars fitted to a Volvo NH15 BP tanker road train

Kangaroos are a primary road safety hazard in Australia, hence the alternative name "roo bar". Kangaroos account for the majority of collisions between vehicles and animals in Australia; the next most common type of animal being wallabies and wombats. This high animal strike incidence is why roo bars are most commonly fitted to vehicles in Australia in outback or rural areas.

Over recent years there has been debate in Australia regarding the safety implications of fitting a bullbar, especially as four-wheel drives and their accessories are becoming increasingly popular in urban areas. The use of bullbars in urban areas is criticised by cycling and pedestrian organisations.

Bullbar manufacturers in Australia must conform to Australian standard AS47861.1/2002. In some states it may be illegal to drive a vehicle fitted with a bullbar that does not comply with the Australian Design Rules (ADRs). The main ADR requirement that applies to bullbars is a clause within ADR 42/xx (where xx designates a version number), which states (in part) that:

No vehicle shall be equipped with any object or fitting, not technically essential to such vehicle, which protrudes from any part of the vehicle so that it is likely to increase the risk of bodily injury to any person.

This requirement is not specifically aimed at bullbars but does effectively prescribe requirements for their construction. ADR 42/00, the first version of this rule, applied to vehicles built from July 1988. Australian Standard AS4876.1-2002 Motor vehicle frontal protection systems Part 1: Road user protection was released in 2002, and applies construction rules to all bullbars manufactured since that date, regardless of the age of the vehicle that they are fitted to. Similar requirements for older vehicles fitted with bullbars manufactured before that Australian Standard was implemented exist only in state legislation.

In 2003, New South Wales State Member of Parliament Anthony Roberts suggested there is little or no enforcement of the ADR requirement and Harold Scruby (of the Pedestrian Council of Australia) has proposed that modern standards should be made retrospective.

Bullbars are not allowed to cause a vehicle to fail to comply with other ADRs to which they were originally constructed. This includes visibility of lights, such as headlights and indicators; but it particularly relates to ADR 69/00, the rule for 'Full frontal impact protection'. In order to comply with this rule, bullbars manufactured for vehicles equipped with SRS (airbag systems) must be tested for compatibility with the airbag system.

The major bull bar manufacturers in Australia are Whitlock Bull Bars, ARB, TJM, ECB, Ironman, Smartbar, Irvin Bullbars, AFN and Uneek.

== See also ==
- Automobile safety
- Cowcatcher (pilot) on locomotives
- Roadkill
- Frontal Protection System
- Off-roading
- Automotive aftermarket
