= Guzman y Gomez =

Australian dining and fast-food chain

Guzman y Gómez

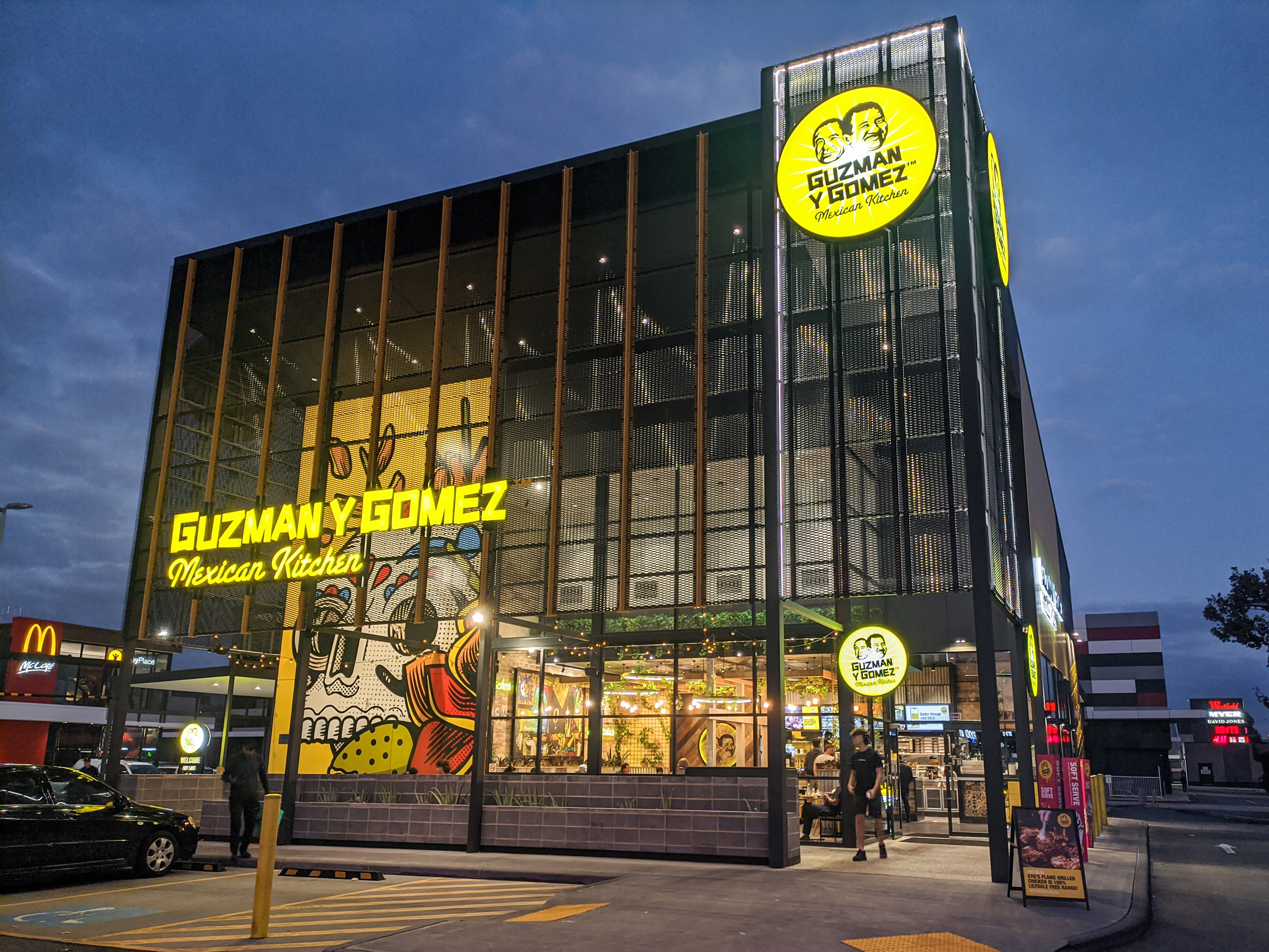
- Guzman y Gomez restaurant in Cannington, Western Australia
- Type: Public company
- Traded as: ASX: GYG
- Industry: Casual dining restaurant; Fast food Franchising
- Founded: 2006
- Headquarters: Surry Hills, New South Wales, Australia
- Number of locations: over 250 restaurants (2025)
- Area served: Australia; Singapore; Japan; United States (formerly)
- Key people: Steven Marks (Founder); Robert Hazan (Co-Founder, NED); Guy Russo (Chairman)
- Products: Mexican food
- Net income: AU$–2.2 million (2023)
- Website: www.guzmanygomez.com.au

Guzman y Gómez (GYG; /ɡʊz.ˈmɑːn iː ɡoʊ ˈmɛz/, Spanish: [ɡusˈman i ˈɣomes]) is a Mexican-themed casual fast food restaurant chain based in Australia. It serves coffee at some restaurants through the "Cafe Hola" brand which operates 24/7.

Guzman y Gomez was established in Sydney in 2006 by Steven Marks and Robert Hazan. It operates over 200 restaurants in Australia, Japan, and Singapore; it formerly had restaurants in the United States. As of 2025, Guzman y Gomez is the sixth-largest fast food chain in Australia by system-wide revenue. (Note: Because not all fast food chains are publicly traded, exact system-wide sales are not universally published. Guzman y Gomez's sixth-place position ($1.09 billion) is established behind McDonald's (~$10.5B), KFC (~$3.0B), Hungry Jack's ($2.36B), Subway (~$1.4B), and Domino's Pizza (~$1.3B), based on a cross-reference of ASX statutory filings and industry market share aggregates from IBISWorld and Burgess Rawson.)

== History ==
Guzman y Gomez was established by Steven Marks, a New Yorker who previously worked as a hedge fund manager. After relocating to Australia, he found the quality of Mexican food to be poor and decided to start a restaurant. He has stated that "real Mexican is really urban, street and hot [...] Latin people are so full of energy and full of life, we wanted to bring that to Australia". He took on his friend Robert Hazan, another New Yorker, as a partner. They named the business after two of Marks' childhood friends.

The first store was opened in King Street, Newtown, Sydney, in 2006. Store openings in Bondi Junction and Kings Cross, followed within a year. By April 2012, there were 12 stores. The first Guzman y Gomez in the Melbourne central business district opened in November 2012. Within 12 years, they opened 100 stores in Australia.

The first international Guzman y Gomez restaurant opened at the end of 2013 in Singapore, followed thereafter by the opening of a restaurant in Tokyo, Japan, in April 2015. In January 2020, Guzman y Gomez's international expansion continued with the opening of their first restaurant in the United States in the Chicago suburb of Naperville. In May 2026, Guzman y Gomez announced the closure of all of their restaurants in the United States.

== Restaurants ==
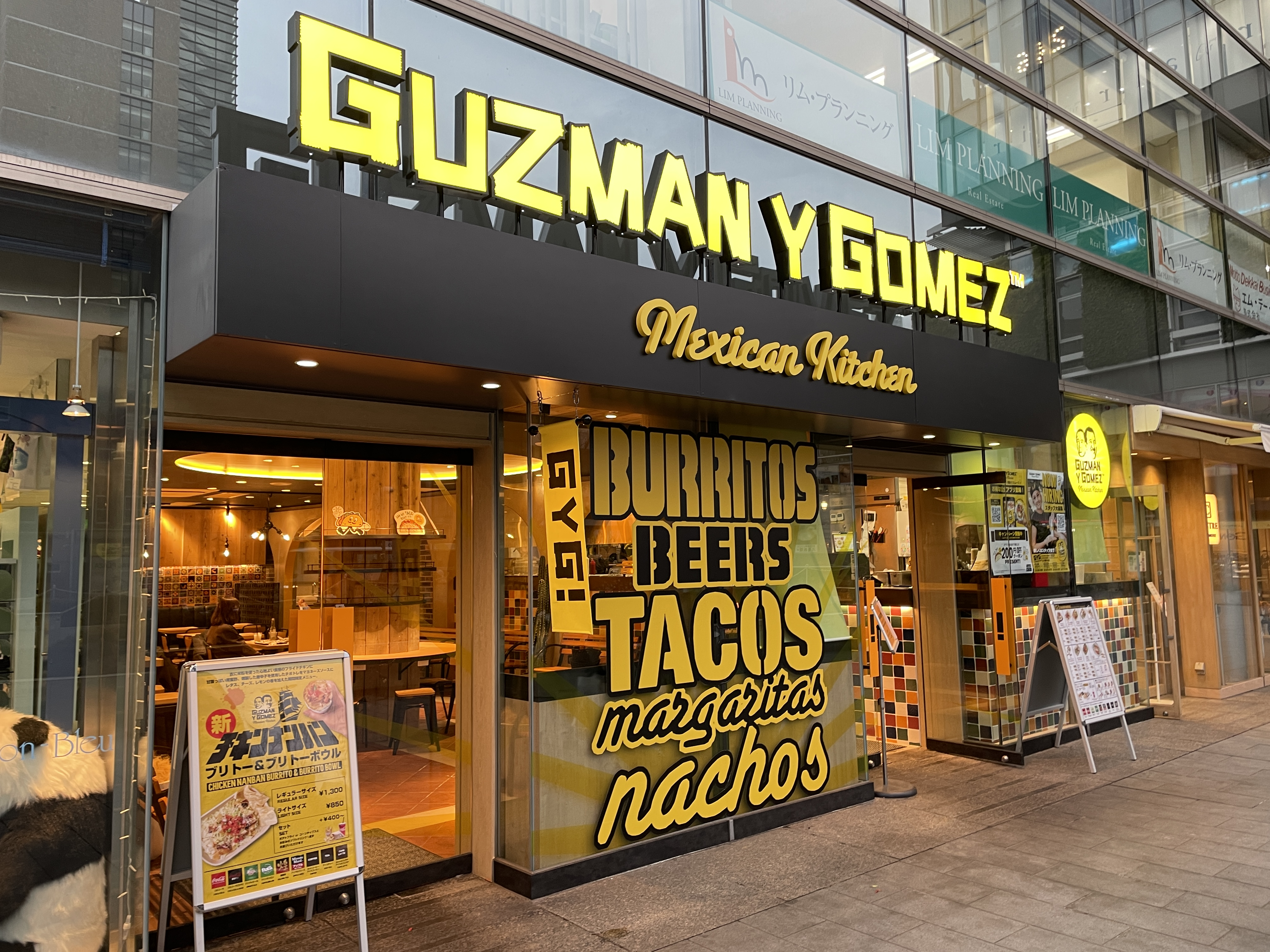
Guzman y Gomez restaurant in the Jingūmae district of Tokyo

In Australia, Guzman y Gomez has 237 restaurants in operation as of the end of 2025, an increase from 167 in May 2024. The business operates internationally with 29 locations in Singapore and Japan.

== Ownership and finance ==
Marks and Hazan initially supported GYG with their own money. In 2009, they sold a minority stake to Peter Ritchie, Guy Russo and Steve Jermyn, who had previously been involved with McDonald's Australia. Russo was subsequently appointed chairman of the board. The board also includes co-founder Robert Hazan, Tom Cowan of TDM Growth Partners, Rokt CEO Bruce Buchanan, and three former McDonalds executives.

Investment firm TDM Growth Partners bought a stake in the company for $44 million in August 2018. In December 2020, the publicly listed Magellan Financial Group bought 10% of the company for $86.8 million. In May 2022, Magellan sold its 11.6% stake in the company to an entity owned by investment bank Barrenjoey Capital Partners for $140 million.

Marks stated in 2019 that his goal was to list GYG on the Australian Securities Exchange. In 2020, he stated that he was also ambitious to expand the company's presence in the United States, citing Australia's "antiquated" labour laws, high rents, and expensive fresh produce.

Marks resigned as CEO due to a health scare in May 2023, but he changed his mind and remained. Hilton Brett was appointed co-CEO in October 2023. GYG was listed on the Australian Securities Exchange on 20 June 2024.

== See also ==
- List of restaurants in Australia
- List of Mexican restaurants
