= HomeCo Daily Needs REIT =

Australian REIT company that focuses on shopping centres

- Trade name: HomeCo.
- Type: Public company
- Traded as: ASX: HDN
- ISIN: AU0000113136
- Industry: Commercial realestate
- Founded: 2017
- Headquarters: Level 7, Gateway, 1 Macquarie Place, Sydney, Australia
- Number of locations: 52 (2022)
- Area served: New South Wales; Queensland; South Australia; Victoria; Western Australia
- Key people: Sid Sharma (CEO)
- Revenue: ▲AU$45.20M (2021); US$198.30M (2022)
- Net income: ▲AU$31.30M (2021); US$335.10M (2022)
- Owner: HMC Capital
- Website: www.hmccapital.com.au/our-funds/homeco-daily-needs-reit/

HomeCo Daily Needs REIT, also known as HomeCo, is an Australian real estate investment trust (REIT) specialising in the ownership and management of Australian shopping centres. The publicly traded company (ASX: HDN) owns 52 shopping centres in 5 Australian states. As of 2022, their centres are valued at $4.6 billion.

== History ==
In 2016, HomeCo's parent company, HMC Capital, acquired the Masters Home Improvement's holding company, Hydrox Holdings Pty Limited, for their property portfolio after its closure in 2016. The $725m acquisition provided HMC Capital with more than 700,000sqm of large scale retail space.

A subsidiary of HMC Capital, HomeCo Daily Needs REIT, was founded by HMC Capital in 2017.

In October 2021, HomeCo's parent company, HMC Capital announced a $2.2 billion merger deal with Aventus Group. The merger was completed in February 2022 and the Aventus Group was delisted from the ASX.

== Financial performance ==
HomeCo Daily Needs REIT was listed on the ASX during November 2020 with a $300m initial public offering and was listed with $844m worth of assets. Since December 2020, its funds under management have grown by 431%.

The REIT is listed on the ASX 200.

== Locations ==
HomeCo has 52 centres across 5 Australian states. There are 19 centres in New South Wales, 12 in Queensland, 2 in South Australia, 15 in Victoria, and 4 in Western Australia. The majority of HomeCo centres are former Masters Home Improvement stores which were acquired in 2016, with the other portion of centres being acquisitions of preexisting centres.
