= Lunchbox locker =

Automatic locking differential form

A lunchbox locker, also known as a pocket locker, is a form of automatic locking differential that is installed by replacing some components of the differential carrier with the components provided by the lunchbox locker. The cost of the lunchbox locker is reduced because it reuses the existing carrier in the differential. It is easier to install because by reusing the carrier, there is no need to replace the shims and bearings, or to re-measure the preload on the ring and pinion. Often, the lunchbox locker can be installed without removing the carrier from the differential, depending on whether the carrier pin can slide past the ring gear.
