= Locking differential =

Mechanical component which forces two transaxial wheels to spin together

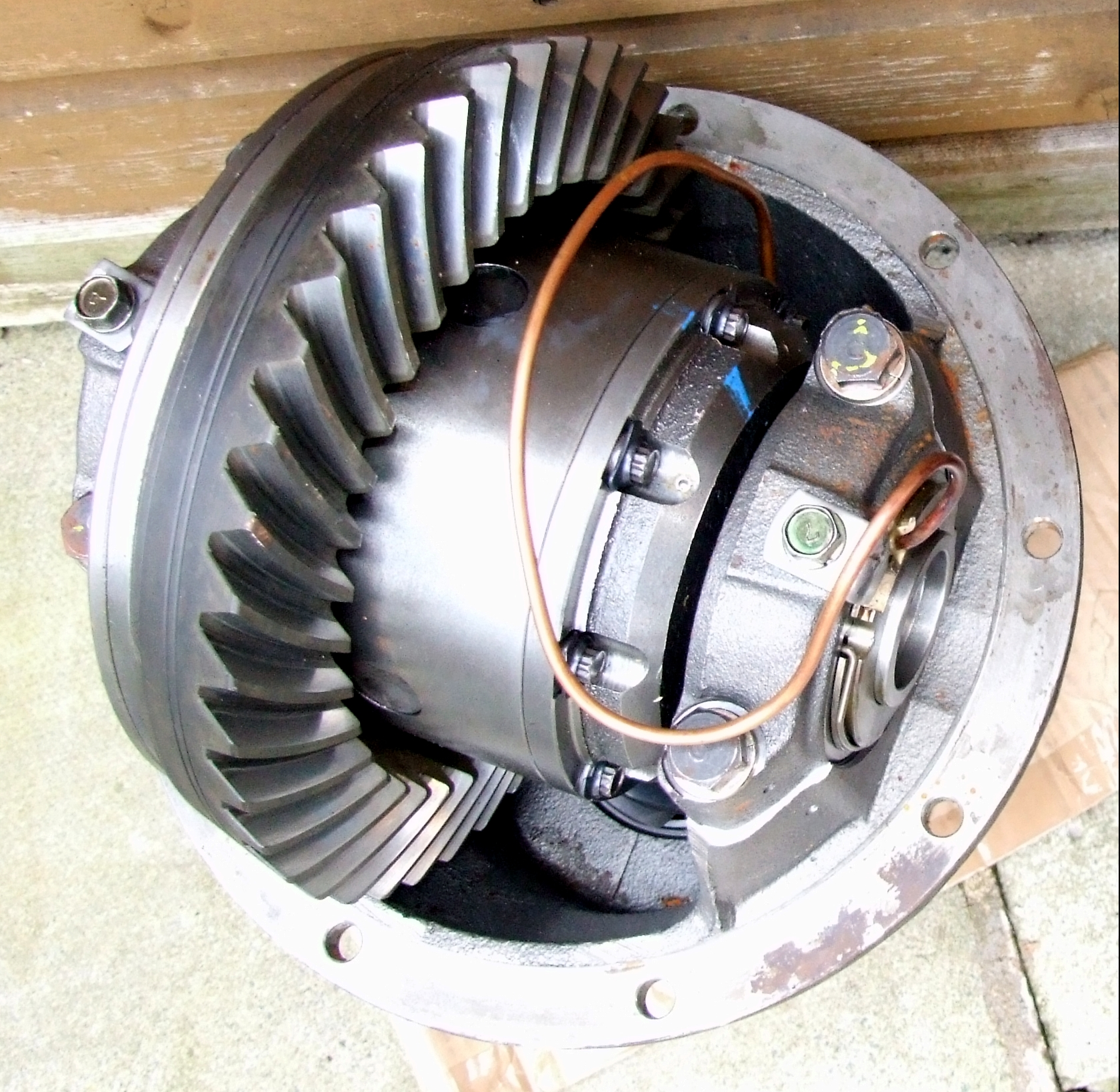
ARB air-locking differential fitted to a Mitsubishi Delica L400 LWB Diff

A locking differential is a mechanical component, commonly used in off-road vehicles, that is designed to overcome the limitations of normal differentials by selectively locking the rotation of the wheels on an axle relative to one another, as if on a common shaft. In contrast to open differentials or limited-slip differentials found in many roadgoing cars, a locked differential forces both wheels to turn at the same speed, regardless of the traction (or lack thereof) available to each wheel individually.

When a differential is unlocked, each wheel is allowed to rotate at different speeds, which is desirable for negotiating turns, as the outside wheel travels a longer distance than the inside wheel. An open differential always provides the same torque to each wheel. Therefore, although the wheels may rotate at different speeds, they apply the same rotational force, even if one is entirely stationary, and the other rotating.

In contrast, a locked differential forces both wheels on a given axle to rotate at the same speed, regardless of the tractional conditions under either wheel. As such, each wheel can apply as much rotational force as the traction under it will allow, and the torques on each side-shaft will be unequal. A locked differential can therefore provide a significant traction advantage over an open differential, especially when the traction under each wheel differs significantly.

Differential locks may be engaged by an operator mechanically (via a lever or cable), hydraulically (fluid pressure moving a locking collar), or electrically (switch energizing a solenoid or actuator). They may also be activated automatically based on torque and speed thresholds.

Central differentials, which are found between the front and rear axles of many full-time four-wheel-drive vehicles, may also be locking differentials, providing similar tractional benefits.

== Applications ==
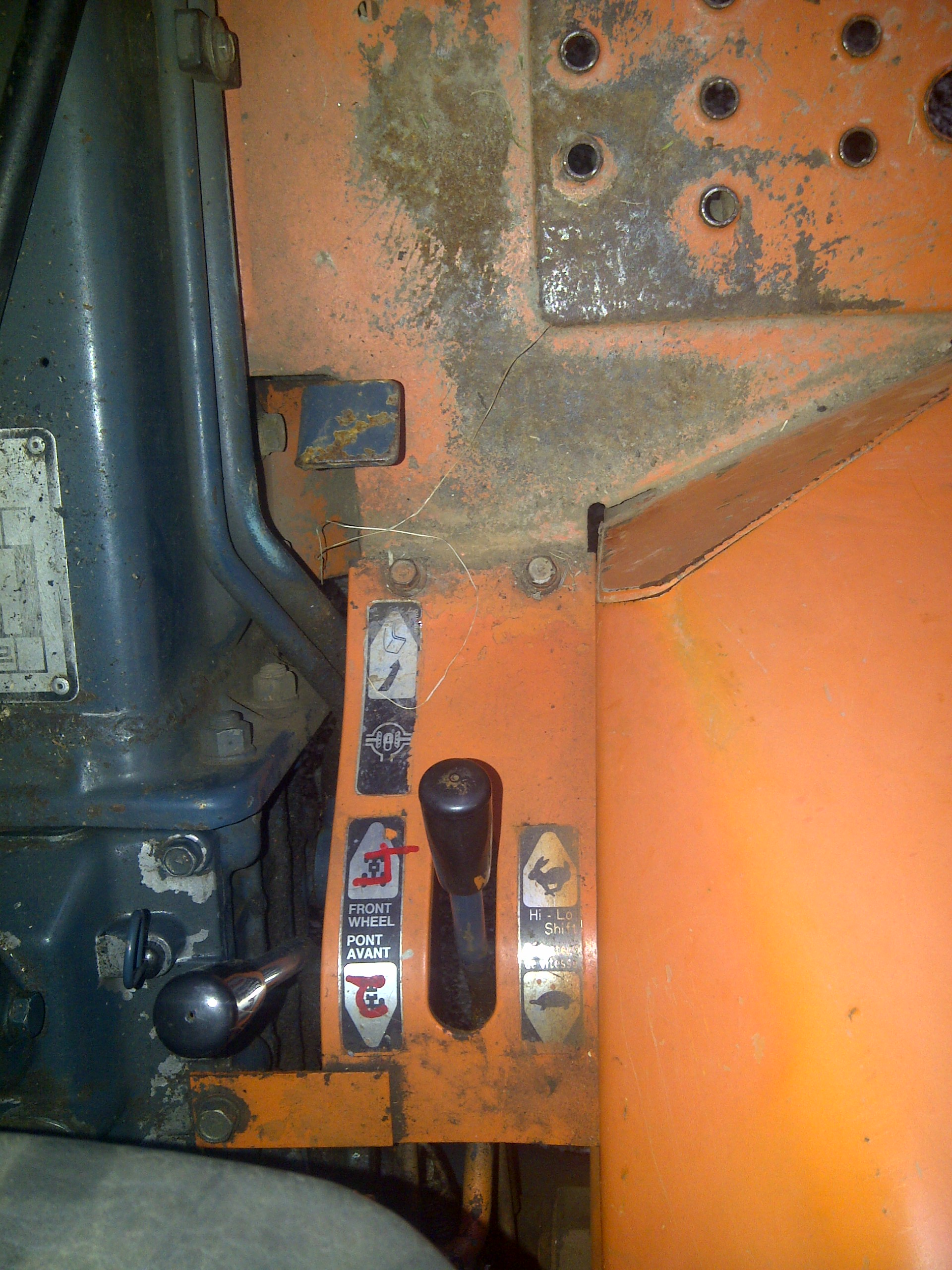
The foot pedal controlling the locking differential on a Kubota B6200. Stepping down on this pedal locks the rear differential. The left lever engages the front axle, and the right one enables selection between high and low speed gearing.

Locking differentials are found in many utility vehicles, trucks, tractors, and other types of heavy equipment. They are especially common in agricultural machinery and military vehicles, where maintaining traction on soft, muddy, or uneven surfaces is important. Some farm tractors provide the operator with a foot pedal that locks the differential when additional traction is needed. In motorsports, locking differentials may be used in place of a limited-slip differential.

Four-wheel drive vehicles intended for off-road use often employ locking differentials to reduce the likelihood of becoming immobilized on loose, muddy, or rocky terrain. Locking differentials are often considered essential equipment for serious off-roading. Many such vehicles have a locking center differential in addition to the front and rear differentials.

== Types ==
=== Automatic lockers ===
Automatic lockers lock and unlock automatically with no direct input from the driver. Some automatic locking differential designs ensure that engine power is always transmitted to both wheels, regardless of traction conditions, and will "unlock" only when one wheel is required to spin faster than the other during cornering. These would be more correctly termed automatic unlocking differentials, because their at-rest position is locked. They will never allow either wheel to spin slower than the differential carrier or axle as a whole, but will permit a wheel to be over-driven faster than the carrier speed. The most common example of this type would be the Detroit Locker, made by Eaton Corporation, also known as the Detroit No-Spin, which replaces the entire differential carrier assembly. Others, sometimes referred to as lunchbox lockers, use the stock differential carrier and replace only the internal spider gears and shafts with interlocking plates. Both types of automatic lockers will allow for a degree of differential wheel speed while turning corners in conditions of equal traction, but will otherwise lock both axle shafts together when traction conditions demand it.

- Pros: Automatic action, no stopping for engagement or disengagement is necessary when road conditions change.
- Cons: Increased tire wear and noticeable impact on driving behaviour. During cornering, which half-axle is uncoupled is dependent on torque direction applied by the driveline. When the torque direction is reversed, the speed of the driveline is suddenly forced to change from the inner to the outer axle, accompanied by tire chirping and a strong jerk. During cornering, the automatic locker is characterized by heavy understeer which transitions instantly to power oversteer when traction is exceeded.

Some other automatic lockers operate as an open differential until wheel slip is encountered and then they lock up. These types generally use an internal governor to monitor vehicle speed and wheel slip. An example of this is the Eaton automatic locking differential (ALD), or Eaton automatic differential lock (ADL), developed by the Eaton Corporation and introduced in 1973 for GM's Rounded-Line C/K Series pickups and utilities. The Eaton ADL is sometimes incorrectly called the Gov-Lok, despite neither GM nor Eaton ever calling it by that name. Gov-Lok is rather an unofficial name of unknown origin that gained popularity over the years. Both Eaton and GM do not know where the name came from, and Eaton has made several unsuccessful attempts in the past to debunk the Gov-Lok name. An updated version of the old Eaton ADL design is still available from Eaton, now known as the Eaton mLocker mechanical differential lock.

Some other automatic lockers operate as an open differential until high torque is applied, at which point they lock up. This style generally uses internal gears systems with very high friction. An example of this is the ZF sliding pins and cams type available for use in early Volkswagens.

=== Selectable lockers MRT ===
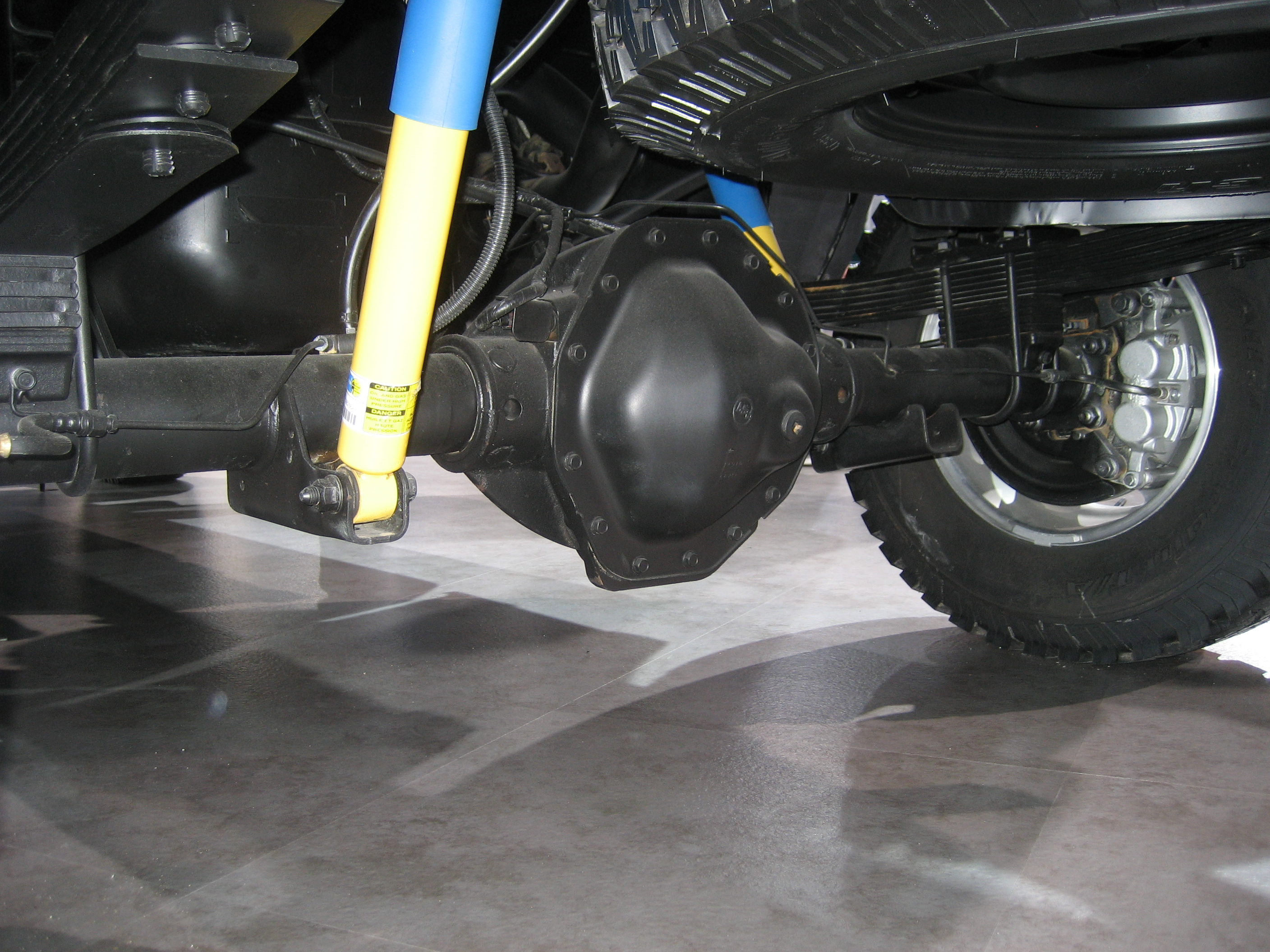
Dodge Power Wagons feature front and rear selectable locking differentials

Selectable lockers allow the driver to lock and unlock the differential at will from the driver's seat. This can be accomplished in many ways.

- Compressed air (pneumatics).
- Vacuum
- Cable-operated mechanism as is employed on the "Ox Locker".
- Electronic solenoids and (electromagnetics) like Eaton's "ELocker". However, OEMs are beginning to offer electronic lockers as well. Nissan Corporation's electric locker can be found as optional equipment on the Frontier (Navara), Xterra, and Titan. Ford offers an electronic rear locker on the F-series and Ranger trucks, as well as the fullsize Bronco. Toyota currently offers a rear e-locker on the Tacoma, 4Runner, and Tundra (2022+) (TRD Off-Road and TRD Pro trims only), but has also offered front and rear e-lockers on vehicles such as the Land Cruiser in the past.
  - Pros: Allows the differential to perform as an "open" differential for improved drivability and maneuverability, and provides full locking capability when it is desirable or needed.
  - Cons: Mechanically complex with more parts to fail. Some lockers require the vehicle to stop for engagement. Needs human interaction and forward-thinking regarding upcoming terrain. Unskilled drivers often put massive stress on driveline components when leaving the differential in locked operation on terrain not requiring a locker.

=== Spool ===
A spool or full spool (in contrast to mini-spool) is a device that connects the two axles directly to the ring gear. There is no differentiation side to side, so a vehicle equipped with a spool will bark tires in turns and may become unmanageable in wet or snowy weather. Spools are usually reserved for competition vehicles not driven on the street.

Mini-spool uses the stock carrier and replaces only the internal components of the differential, similar in installation to the lunchbox locker. A full spool replaces the entire carrier assembly with a single machined piece. A full spool is perhaps the strongest means of locking an axle, but has no ability to differentiate wheel speeds whatsoever, putting high stress on all affected driveline components.

The internal spider gears of an open differential can also be welded together to make a locked axle; this method is not recommended as the welding process seriously compromises the metallurgical composition of the welded components, and can lead to failure of the unit under stress.

==== Welded differential ====
Regular "open differential" with internal gears welded together to form a locked differential or spool. Common for drifting or offroading where locking differentials are too expensive or unreliable.

== Disadvantages ==
Because they do not operate as smoothly as standard differentials, automatic locking differentials are often responsible for increased tire wear. Some older automatic locking differentials are known for making a clicking or banging noise when locking and unlocking as the vehicle negotiates turns. This is annoying to many drivers. Automatic locking differentials also affect the ability of a vehicle to steer, particularly if a locker is located in the front axle. Aside from tire scuffing while turning any degree on high friction (low slip) surfaces, locked axles cause understeer and, if used on the front axle, will increase steering forces required to turn the vehicle. Furthermore, automatically locking differentials can cause a loss of control on ice where an open differential would allow one wheel to spin and the other to hold, while not transferring power. An example of this would be a vehicle parked sideways on a slippery grade. When both wheels spin, the vehicle will break traction and slide down the grade.

== Alternatives ==
Limited-slip differentials (LSD) are considered a compromise between a standard differential and a locking differential because they operate more smoothly, and they do direct some extra torque to the wheel with the most traction compared to a standard differential, but are not capable of 100% lockup.

Traction control systems are also used in many modern vehicles, either in addition to, or as a replacement of, locking differentials. Examples include: Volkswagen's electronic differential lock (EDL), Opel's TC+ installed for the first time in Opel Astra G (2001), et cetera. This is not in fact a differential lock, but operates at each wheel. Sensors monitor wheel speeds, and if one is rotating more than a specified number of revolutions per minute (e.g. 100) than the other (i.e. slipping) the traction control system momentarily brakes it. This transfers more power to the other wheel, but still employs the open differential, which is the same as on cars without the EDL option. If all drive wheels lose traction, then throttle control may be automatically applied. Electronic traction control systems may be integrated with anti-lock braking systems, which have a similar action on braking and use some similar components. Such systems are used for example on the most recent Nissan Pathfinder, Land Rover Defender, Land Rover Freelander, the McLaren P1 and the McLaren 650s.

Welded differential (commonly referred to as welded diff), the gears in an (open) differential are welded together as to function as if there was no differential. This is a cheap alternative for offroading or drifting.

Individual wheel drive (IWD), using separate engines, motors and/or gearboxes for each wheel in a vehicle, so that there is no need for torque distribution with drivetrain components from a centralised location.
