= Perseus Mining =

Gold mining company

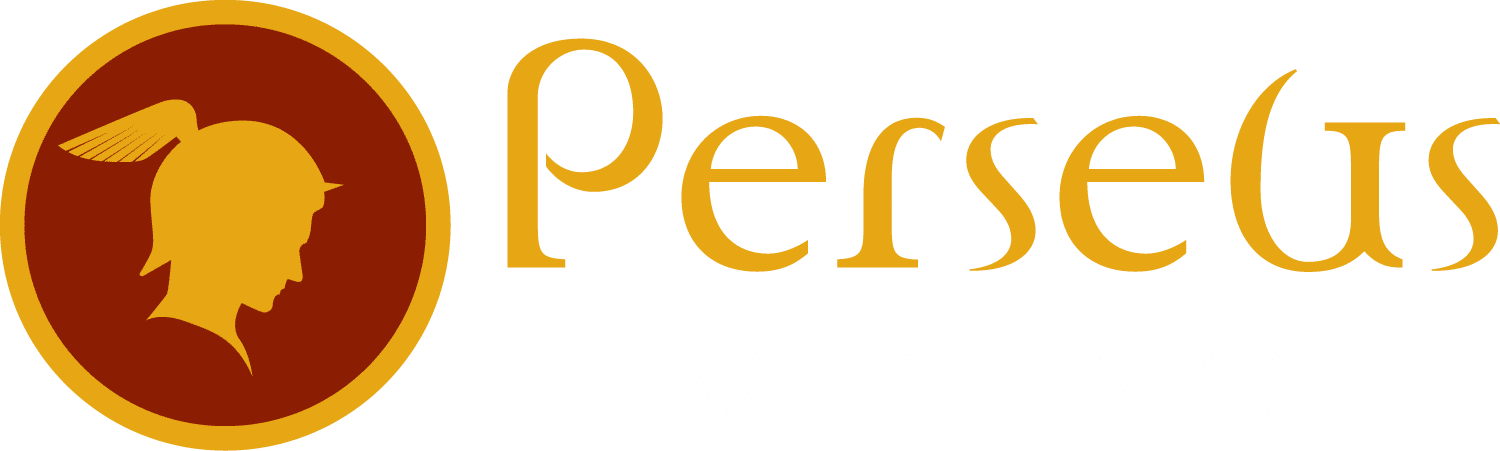
- Traded as: ASX: PRU
- Industry: Mining
- Founded: 2003
- Headquarters: Subiaco, Western Australia
- Products: Gold
- Production output: 496,551 ounces (2024–25)
- Revenue: $1,248 million (2024-25)
- Net income: $371 million (2024-25)
- Website: www.perseusmining.com

Perseus Mining is an Australian gold mining company with operations in Côte d'Ivoire, Ghana and Tanzania.

It is a constituent of the S&P/ASX 200 index.

== History ==
Perseus Mining was incorporated on 24 October 2003 with the goal of acquiring, exploring and developing prospective gold projects in West Africa and the Kyrgyz Republic. It was listed on the Australian Securities Exchange on 22 September 2004.

In 2006, Perseus Mining was granted rights to acquire the Ayanfuri gold mine which had previously produced over 300,000oz of gold since 1994. The Ayanfuri gold project was later developed becoming the Edikan Gold Mine, Perseus's first operational mine.

== Operations ==
=== Current ===
- Edikan Gold Mine, Ghana (Perseus's first mine, achieving gold production in 2011)
- Sissingué Gold Mine, Côte d'Ivoire (Perseus's second mine, achieving first gold production in 2018)
- Yaouré Gold Mine, Côte d'Ivoire (Perseus's third mine, achieving first gold pouring in December 2020)

=== Future ===
- Nyanzaga Gold Project, Tanzania (Acquired by Perseus in May 2024. Mine construction has commenced and first gold is expected in 2027)

=== Former ===
- Meyas Sands Gold Project, Sudan (Purchased by Perseus in May 2022. Divested in April 2026 for US$260 million)

== Controversies ==
Perseus Mining has been accused of shifting accounting profits out of Africa to avoid paying local taxes.
