= Sand flag =

Flag for off-road vehicles

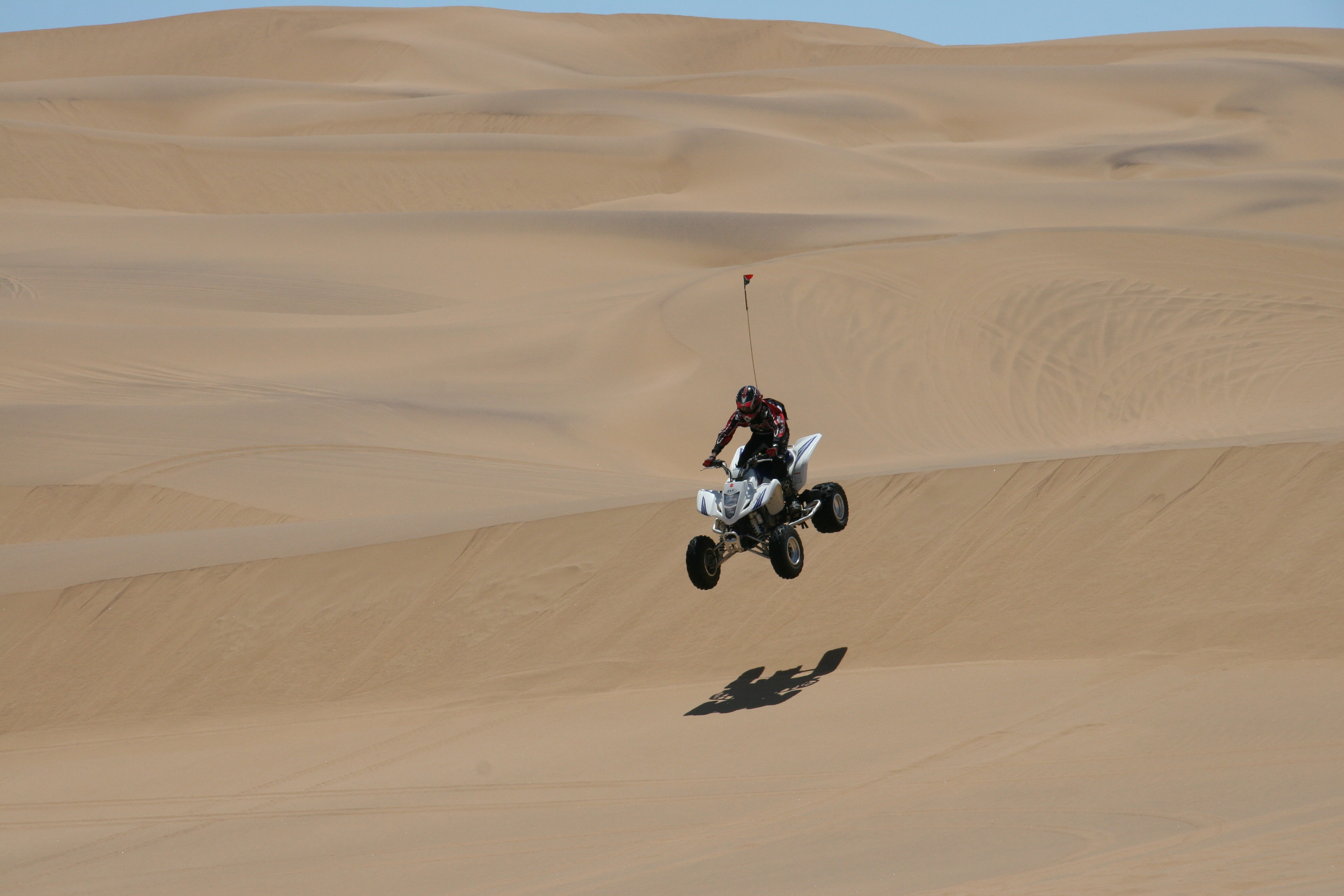
An all-terrain vehicle with a red sand flag

A sand flag is a flag designed to be fitted to the front of an off-road vehicle during operation on sandy or dusty terrain. It is mounted on a long (usually slender, whiplike) pole that projects high enough from the vehicle to be clearly visible above the dust or sand cloud generated while the vehicle is in motion. The flag indicates the actual position of the vehicle within the cloud which can be important for safety reasons. Similar devices are often seen on vehicles such as sand rails – a small fluorescent triangle flag mounted to the rear of the vehicle, although in that case it also is helpful to allow other vehicles to see its location beyond the crest of a dune. It is similar, although generally larger and taller than, safety flags used by some bicyclists in urban areas, which allow them to be more visible when in front of a tall vehicle, or obscured by an object or vehicle.
