= 4DMedical =

Australian medical technology company

4DMedical, Ltd.
- Formerly: 4Dx
- Type: Public
- Traded as: ASX: 4DX
- Industry: Medical Technology
- Founded: 2013; 13 years ago
- Headquarters: Melbourne, Victoria, Australia,
- Key people: Andreas Fouras; (CEO)
- Products: XV LVAS (X-ray Velocimetry Lung Ventilation Analysis Software); CT LVAS (Computed Tomography Lung Ventilation Analysis Software); XV Scanner
- Website: 4dmedical.com

4DMedical is a medical technology company, based in Australia and the United States.

4DMedical created X-ray Velocimetry Lung Ventilation Analysis Software (XV LVAS) based on the company's proprietary XV Technology. XV Technology uses patented algorithms adapted from advanced aerodynamics research to process and enhance X-ray and Computed Tomography (CT) images. Airflow is measured throughout all regions of the lung, across all phases of the breath—providing clinicians with quantitative lung ventilation data in a report.

4DMedical has commercialized its XV Technology via a Software as a Service (SaaS) model, where patients are scanned using existing imaging equipment and analyzed by 4DMedical remotely. Airflow is measured throughout all regions of the lung, across all phases of the breath, delivering the capability to quantify regional lung function throughout the respiratory cycle, at every location within the lung. The lung function data is provided to clinicians and patients in a report that includes color-coded lung images. This approach enables the detection of subtle functional losses before lung structure is irreversibly effected by the disease. Thus, treatment may be applied early to increase impact and outcomes.

== History ==
Founded in 2013, 4DMedical commenced business as 4DX, started as a private company and listed on the Australian Securities Exchange Ltd. (ASX: 4DX) in August 2020.

Prior to founding 4DMedical, Dr. Andreas Fouras was a professor of Biomedical Engineering, and worked closely with the researchers from the Departments of Physics and Physiology at Monash University (Melbourne, Australia) to develop the underlying technology behind 4DMedical's XV Technology. In 2005 Fouras conceptualized 4D imaging using X-rays and in 2009, the first patent for XV Technology was filed. Fouras and his colleagues adapted wind-tunnel imaging techniques used by engineers to develop a new technique that combines fluoroscopy and advanced visualization to generate high-resolution images of the motion of, and airflow through, lung tissue. XV Technology research has been documented in over 100 peer-reviewed publications and over 72 patents and patent applications.

== PACT Act and Lung Disease in Veterans Exposed to Burn Pits ==
The PACT Act (Sergeant First Class Heath Robinson Honoring our Promise to Address Comprehensive Toxics Act of 2022) was signed into U.S. law in 2022, and expands Veteran Affairs (VA) healthcare and benefits for previously deployed veterans who were exposed to burn pits and other toxic substances. 4DMedical has worked closely with advocacy groups such as Burn Pits 360 on difficult-to-diagnose lung diseases in exposed US military veterans. Ongoing studies at the Vanderbilt University Medical Center and the Nashville VAMC have indicated a correlation in findings between non-invasive XV LVAS lung analysis and open lung biopsies.

== Software products ==
=== XV LVAS ===
X-ray Velocimetry Lung Ventilation Analysis Software (XV LVAS) is a non-invasive assessment of regional lung motion and airflow. It provides data to generate detailed maps of both the patterns of lung motion and pulmonary function, with functional deficits detected through local (regional) differences in movement. The XV LVAS report analyzes the lungs in three dimensions (3D) over time, during multiple phases of tidal (normal) breathing, resulting in four-dimensional (4D) measurements.

XV LVAS was released to market after receiving regulatory clearance by the US FDA in May 2020 and released in Australia after listing on the ARTG in 2021.

=== CT LVAS ===
Computed Tomography Lung Ventilation Analysis Software (CT LVAS) provides a non-invasive assessment of regional lung motion and airflow. It provides data to generate detailed maps of both the patterns of lung motion and pulmonary function, with functional deficits detected through local (regional) differences in movement. The CT LVAS report analyzes the lungs in three dimensions (3D), between two phases of the breath at breath hold.

It is a cloud-based technology that processes and analyzes non-contrast thoracic CT images (one at the inspiratory phase and one at expiratory phase) as the input. CT LVAS uses existing hardware and integrates into clinical workflows.

CT LVAS was released to the market in Australia after listing on the ARTG in 2022.

== Hardware products ==
=== XV Scanner ===
4DMedical's wholly owned subsidiary, Australian Lung Health Initiative (ALHI), received AUD$28.9 million in funding from the Australian Federal Government's Medical Research Future Fund (MRFF) Frontier Health and Medical Research to develop the world's first dedicated lung function scanner, XV Scanner. The XV Scanner uses XV Technology to deliver dynamic, detailed, and quantitative lung function measurements to clinicians. The capability to quantify a patient's regional lung function improves management of lung conditions. The XV Scanner overcomes differs from existing lung diagnostic and imaging tools by providing low-dose contrast-free, rapid lung analysis for adults and children.

=== Permetium Preclinical Scanner ===
The Permetium, a small animal scanner, is the first commercially dedicated preclinical imaging system that can quantify regional changes in pulmonary function. It was built for researchers and is compatible with XV Technology. As a small animal diagnostic tool, researchers can use the technology to develop novel therapeutics and new drug compounds. The scanner offers high resolution and high sensitivity scanning. It can be used as an X-ray device, a 3D CT scanner, and a 4D CT scanner. The scanner technology can significantly decrease the number of animals required for experiments, as individual time points no longer require the sacrifice of groups of animals for a readout of lung pathology.
