= ARB 4x4 Accessories =

Australian off-road accessory company

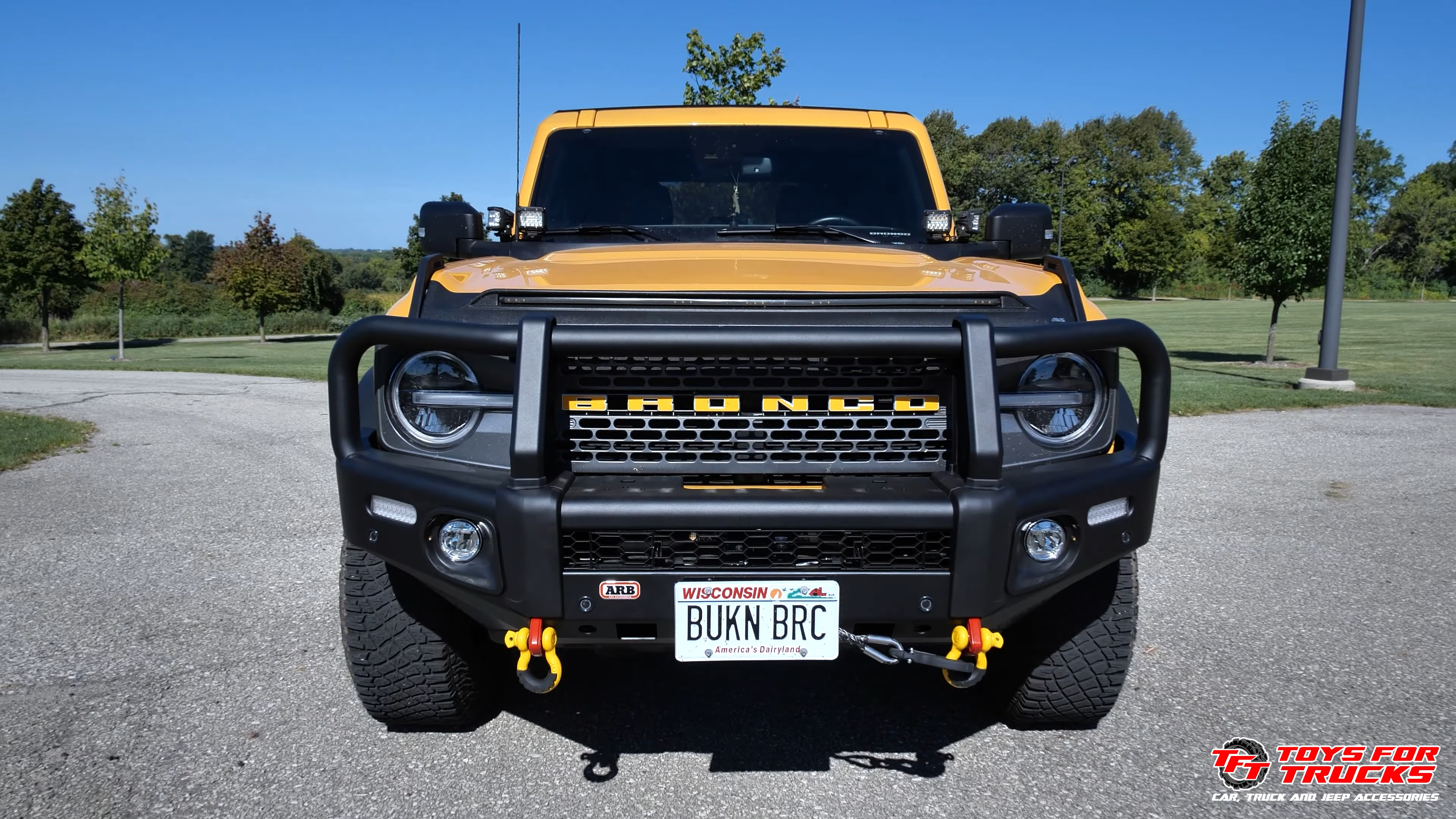
- Ford Bronco with an ARB bullbar
- Traded as: ASX: ARB
- Industry: Automotive
- Founded: 1975; 51 years ago
- Founder: Tony Brown
- Headquarters: Kilsyth, Victoria, Australia
- Number of locations: 60 (Australia) (2020)
- Area served: Australia, United States, Middle East, Europe
- Key people: Lachlan McCann (CEO)
- Products: Automotive parts and accessories
- Website: www.arb.com.au

ARB 4x4 Accessories is an Australian off-road accessory company founded in 1975 (Note: ARB was registered as a company in 1976) by Tony Brown in Melbourne. Australian manufacturing is done at a 16,723 m^{2} (180,005 sq ft) location in Kilsyth, Victoria, where its headquarters is located.

Brown started building bullbars and roof racks at his own home in 1975, after traveling from Melbourne to Cape York in his Land Rover Series I. In 1976 Brown registered the company ARB engineering Pty Ltd. after his initials (Anthony Robert Brown), and purchased a 93 m^{2} (1,001 sq ft) workshop in Ringwood, Victoria.

ARB bought the rights to the 'Roberts Diff Lock' in 1987, marketing it as the Air Locker in Australia and America, and bought Old Man Emu suspension in 1988. ARB has been listed on the ASX since 1987.

Starting 2021 Ford offers several ARB accessories for the Ranger and Everest as 'Ford Licensed Accessories' through participating dealers in Australia, and started offering factory-backed ARB accessories developed in partnership with Ford for the Bronco in America. ARB secured a supply contract with Rivian in the same year.
