= Barrenjoey Capital Partners =

Australian Investment Bank

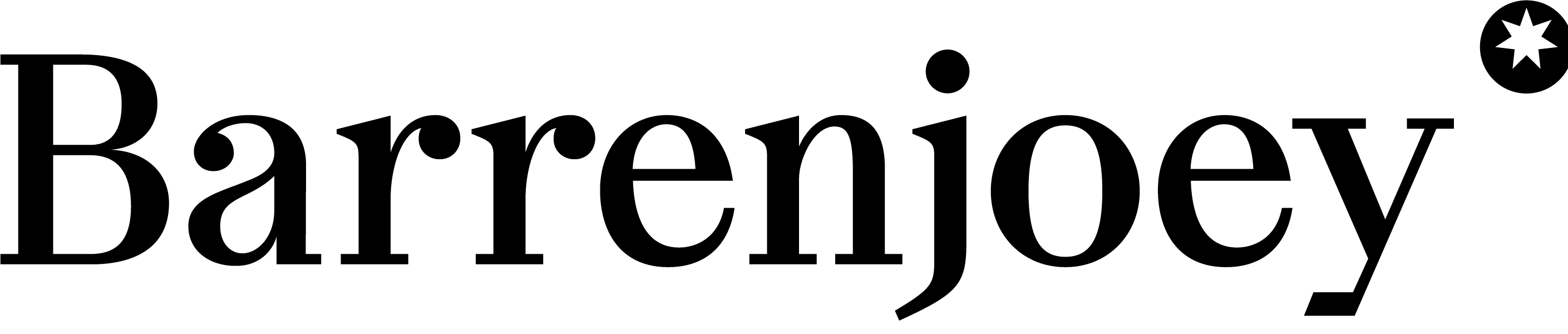

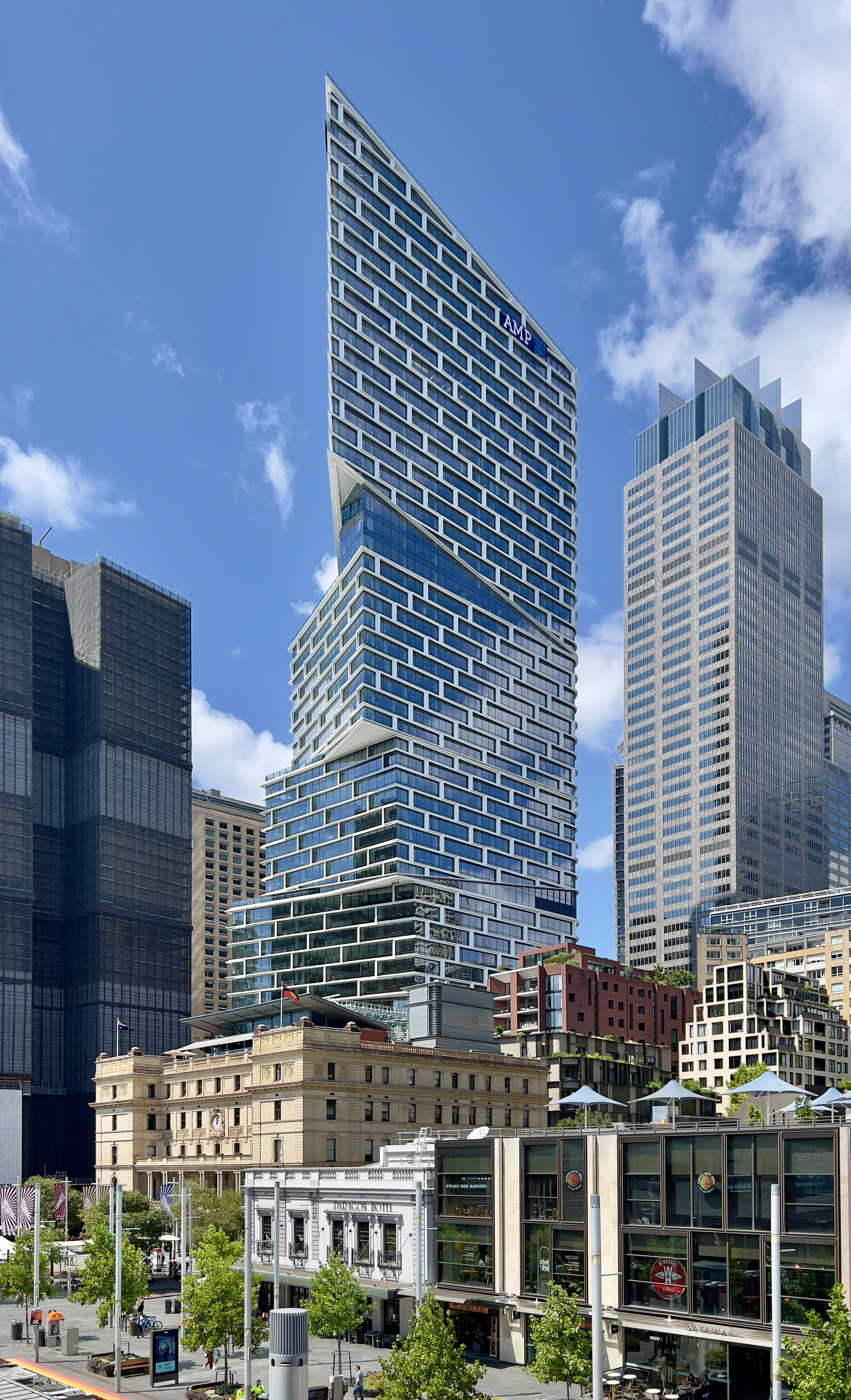
- Headquarters at Quay Quarter Tower
- Type: Private company
- Industry: Financial services
- Founded: September 21, 2020
- Headquarters: Quay Quarter Tower, Sydney, Australia
- Key people: David Gonski (Non-Executive chairman); Ken MacKenzie (Strategic Advisor); Brian Benari (CEO)
- Products: Investment banking Securities brokerage Securities research
- Owner: Barrenjoey employees (45.4%); Magellan Financial Group (36.4%); Barclays (18.2%)
- Number of employees: 350 (2023)
- Website: www.barrenjoey.com

Barrenjoey Capital Partners (Barrenjoey) is an Australian investment banking firm that is headquartered in Sydney with additional offices in Melbourne, Perth, Abu Dhabi, and Hong Kong.

== History ==
=== Founding (2020) ===
In May 2020, former UBS Australia chairman Guy Fowler and UBS Australia Head Matthew Grounds were in the process of launching their own firm with the backing of Magellan Financial Group and Barclays and had already received signed contracts from 50 to 60 people ready to join the new firm. However the firm did not launch as planned as the two felt they were not ready, the structure needed to be changed and they lacked someone to run it for them. Eventually hired Brian Benari who was previously the CEO of financial services group, Challenger.

On 21 September 2020, the new firm was officially launched as Barrenjoey (meaning young Kangaroo) with 60 employees. Magellan owned a 40% stake in the firm while Barclays owned a 9.99% stake. Barrenjoey and Barclays would work on deals together where Barrenjoey would act in an advisory capacity to the parties while Barclays would provide the financing of the deal.

During its start and early period, Barrenjoey poached many employees from UBS.

In December 2020, Barrenjoey did its first corporate finance deal by advising the merger between Aussie and Lendi. Its first equities trade was buying shares in Qantas. The firm grew at a very fast pace and became involved in multiple high-profile deals.

=== Recent years (2021-2025) ===
In February 2021, businessman David Gonski joined Barrenjoey as a Non-executive chairman. In April 2021, former government minister Kelly O'Dwyer was added to the board of directors as the firm sought to raise female representation.

In September 2024, former Reserve Bank governor Philip Lowe joined the board of directors. In June 2025, Fiona Hick was appointed to the board of directors

By mid 2021, BHP chairman, Ken MacKenzie joined the firm as a Strategic Advisor. MacKenzie supported Jes Staley of Barclays to back Barrenjoey which would help expand Barclays' presence in Asia. Despite his link with Barrenjoey being considered a conflict of interest, BHP hired Barrenjoey to advise on its acquisition of Oz Minerals.

In May 2022, Barclays increased its stake in Barrenjoey to 18.2%.

On 9 February 2023, Governor of the Reserve Bank of Australia, Philip Lowe had a closed door meeting with Barrenjoey which was leaked to the media. The move attracted criticism and Lowe later stated he would avoid attending events at the firm "for quite some time".

In June 2023, Barrenjoey moved its headquarters to the Quay Quarter Tower. In the same period the firm was expanding its new departments which included fixed income, private investments and prime brokerage as its corporate finance advisory business slowed due to market conditions.

In August 2024, the Australian Financial Review reported that Barrenjoey for the first time since its establishment had made a net profit and was paying dividends.

In April 2024, Barrenjoey opened its first overseas office in Abu Dhabi. In February 2025, Barrenjoey opened a further overseas office in Hong Kong following the acquisition of Forsyth Barr’s Asian business. In 2025, Barrenjoey plans to register as a Swap Dealer with the National Futures Association.
