= Pinnacle Investment Management =

Australian investment management firm

Pinnacle Investment Management Group Limited

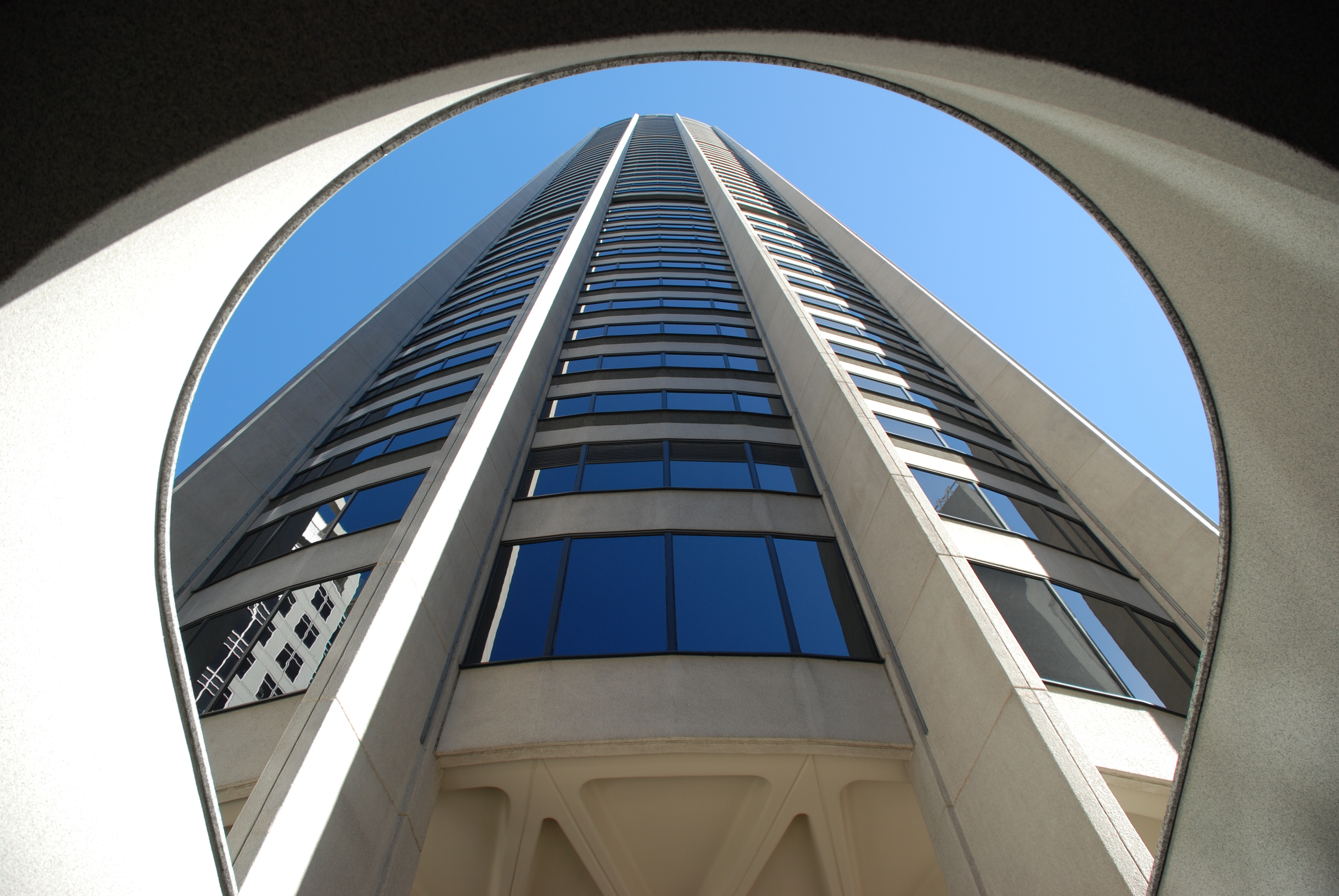
- Headquarters at Australia Square
- Formerly: Wilson HTM Investment Group
- Type: Public
- Traded as: ASX: PNI; S&P/ASX 200 component; S&P/ASX 300 component
- Industry: Investment management
- Founded: 2006; 20 years ago
- Founder: Ian Macoun
- Headquarters: Australia Square, Sydney, New South Wales, Australia
- Key people: Alan Watson (Chairman); Ian Macoun (CEO)
- Products: Mutual funds; ETFs; LICs; UCITS
- Net income: ▲ A$134.4 million (FY 2025)
- AUM: ▲ A$202.5 billion (31 December 2025)
- Total equity: ▲ A$918.42 million (FY 2025)
- Website: pinnacleinvestment.com

Pinnacle Investment Management (Pinnacle) is an Australian investment management company. It is publicly traded on the Australian Securities Exchange and is a constituent member of the S&P/ASX 200 and S&P/ASX 300 indices. The company takes stakes in other investment management firms as affiliates and offers them administrative support and other services.

== Background ==
The origins of Pinnacle can be traced to Wilson HTM Investment Group (Wilson HTM), an Australian stockbroker and later investment management firm that was established in 1895.

In 2006, Pinnacle became an affiliated organisation of Wilson HTM. Pinnacle was founded by Ian Macoun. According to Wilson this was done to separate the brokerage business from the fund managers who would operate better at arm's length with the maximum ownership of them being 50%. Initially, two affiliates under Wilson HTM were transferred to Pinnacle. They were Hyperion Asset Management led by Emmanuel Clive Pohl and Plato Investment Management led by Don Hamson.

In 2005, Deutsche Bank acquired a 19.9% stake in Wilson HTM.

In 2007, Wilson HTM held its initial public offering and became a listed company on the Australia Stock Exchange. The offering raised A$25 million. The majority of proceeds were to be used seed new investment managers that would become affiliates of Pinnacle.

In 2015, Wilson HTM decided to focus on investment management and spun-off its stockbroking business via a management buyout.

In 2016, Wilson HTM acquired the remaining 25% stake in Pinnacle it did not own giving it complete control. Then Wilson HTM was rebranded to Pinnacle its stock ticker was changed. Macoun who was now in charge of the company negotiated deals and invested his own cash to replace the legacy shareholders and rid the company of some legacy payments to management and directors.

As at 31 December 2026, Pinnacle reported A$202.5 billion in assets under management. At this point in time, Pinnacle had 19 affiliates under it.
