= DroneShield =

Australian counter-drone technology company

- Company type: Public company
- Traded as: ASX: DRO
- Industry: Defense technology
- Founded: 2014
- Founders: Brian Hearing; John Franklin
- Headquarters: Sydney, Australia
- Key people: Angus Bean (CEO & Managing Director)
- Products: Counter-drone systems, electronic warfare equipment
- Website: droneshield.com

DroneShield is an Australian defense technology company specializing in counter-drone systems and electronic warfare solutions. As of 2024, it is Australia's most valuable publicly listed defense company by market capitalization.

== History ==
DroneShield was founded in 2014 by Brian Hearing and John Franklin, two defense industry researchers. The company originated from work on acoustic detection systems initially designed for mosquito detection. The founders pivoted to developing counter-drone technology after identifying military and security applications for similar detection methods.

The company listed on the Australian Securities Exchange in 2016, raising A$7 million at a valuation of A$20 million. Oleg Vornik serves as the company's chief executive officer, having joined in 2015.

DroneShield's stock experienced significant growth in 2024, becoming the best-performing stock on the S&P/ASX 200 index. The company achieved a market capitalization of A$2.9 billion (US$1.9 billion) and reported record quarterly revenue in the third quarter of 2024.

== Operations ==
DroneShield's products are deployed in over 40 countries, including the United States, Canada, France, and Poland. The company's technology has been utilized in the Ukraine conflict. Manufacturing operations are based in Sydney, with plans to expand production capabilities to Europe and North America.

The company distributes products through partnerships, including with BT Group in the United Kingdom. Major customers include military organizations, airports, correctional facilities, and law enforcement agencies.

== See also ==
- Electronic warfare
- Defense industry of Australia
