= Ken McKenzie (footballer, born 1887) =

Australian rules footballer

Personal information
- Full name: James Edward Kenneth McKenzie
- Born: 20 April 1887; Lancefield, Victoria
- Died: 3 May 1958 (aged 71); Mildura, Victoria
- Original team: Mooroopna

Playing career^{1}
Years	Club	Games (Goals)
1909–11	St Kilda	14 (7)
- ^{1} Playing statistics correct to the end of 1911.

James Edward Kenneth McKenzie (20 April 1887 – 3 May 1958) was an Australian rules footballer who played with St Kilda in the Victorian Football League (VFL).

McKenzie travelled down to Melbourne from Mooroopna each week. His great grandson is four times national 100 metre champion, Shane Naylor.
