= Ken MacKenzie (businessman) =

Canadian businessman (born 1964)

- Born: Kenneth Norman MacKenzie; March 1964 (age 62); Canada
- Education: McGill University
- Occupation: Business executive
- Known for: Former CEO, Amcor; Former Chairman, BHP
- Title: Chairman, Melbourne Business School

Kenneth Norman MacKenzie (born March 1964) is a Canadian-born business executive known for his tenure as chairman of BHP, a multinational mining company, and as the former CEO of Amcor, an international packaging company.

== Background ==
MacKenzie earned a bachelor's degree in engineering from McGill University in Canada. He worked as a strategy consultant for Accenture in Canada before moving to Australia.

== Career ==
=== Amcor ===
MacKenzie joined Amcor, an international packaging company, in 1992. Over the course of 23 years, he held various roles before being appointed managing director and CEO beginning in July 2005. During his time working with Amcor, MacKenzie oversaw more than 30 acquisitions, which increased the company’s market capital from $4 billion to approximately $15.5 billion, and the company’s return on capital from 10% to 19%. He also oversaw the spinoff of the company’s Australian and New Zealand assets in 2013, creating Orora Ltd. MacKenzie stepped down from his role as CEO in April 2015.

=== BHP ===
MacKenzie joined BHP, a multinational mining company, as a director in September 2016. In June 2017, it was announced that he would succeed Jac Nasser as chairman of BHP Billiton, a multinational mining company, in September. Prior to his succession as chairman, MacKenzie was initially sought out by Nasser to become BHP’s new CEO, an offer that MacKenzie declined. After nine years with the company, in February 2025, MacKenzie announced his intention to depart from his role as chairman of BHP. He was succeeded by former chief executive of the National Australia Bank, Ross McEwan, at the end of March. Throughout MacKenzie’s tenure with BHP, he oversaw BHP’s unification of its structure to one main Australian entity, the shifting of the company’s portfolio from coal to copper, and the approval of major investments in Canadian potash. Total shareholder returns had grown at a compound annual rate of 20 percent during MacKenzie’s term as chairman, making BHP one of the largest dividend payers in the world at the time.

=== Other roles ===
In 2021, MacKenzie joined Barrenjoey Capital Partners as a strategic advisor. He also sits on the advisory board of American Securities Capital Partners.

In 2023, MacKenzie was appointed as the Chair of the Melbourne Business School. Before his appointment, MacKenzie founded a program for chief executives of ASX-listed companies, which is hosted at the school.

MacKenzie served as a Fellow of the Australian Institute of Company Directors.
