= Magellan Financial Group =

Financial company

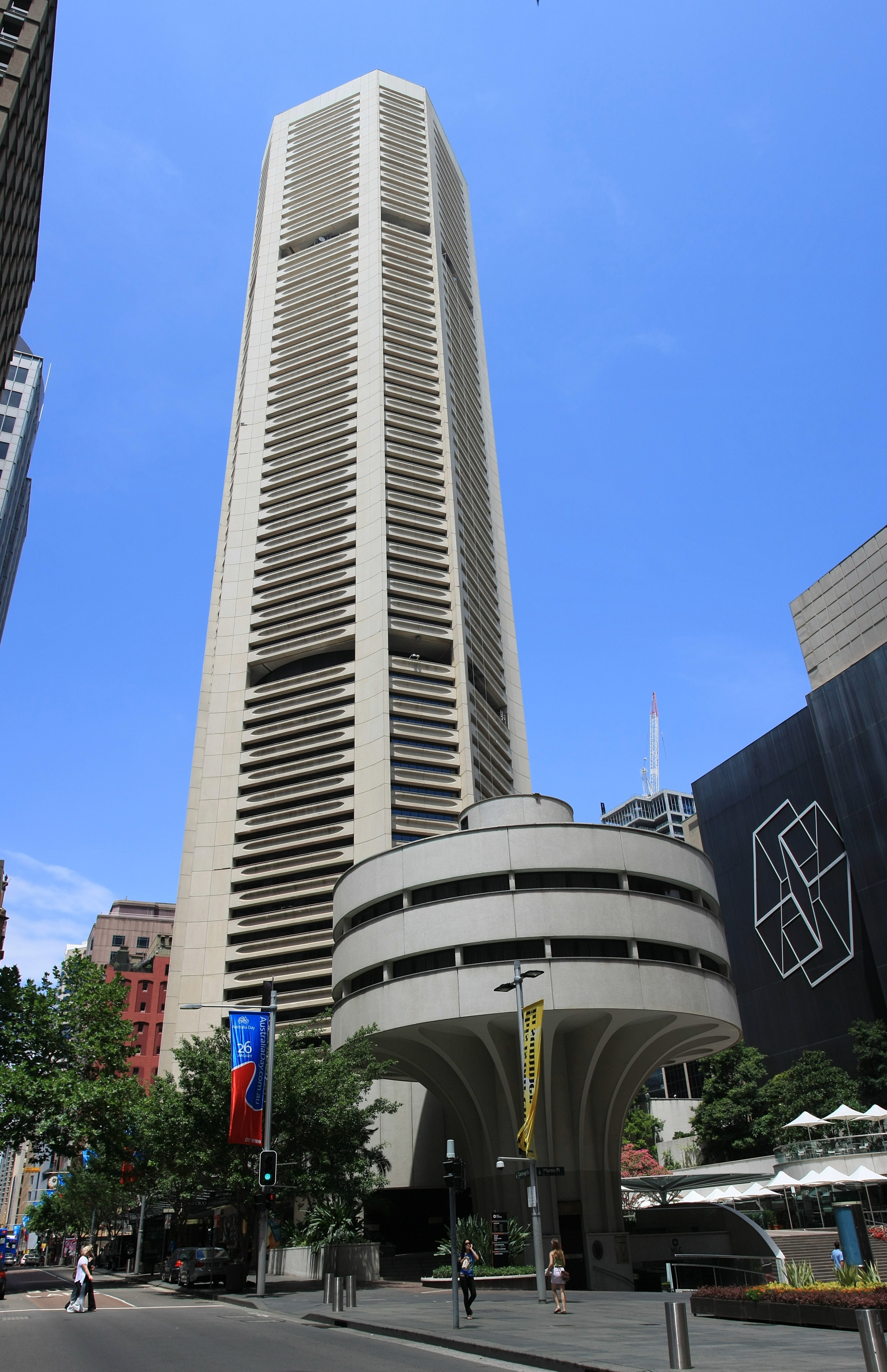
- Headquarters at 25 Martin Place
- Company type: Public
- Traded as: ASX: MFG
- ISIN: AU000000MFG4
- Industry: Investment management
- Founded: 2006
- Headquarters: Sydney, New South Wales, Australia
- Key people: Sophia Rahmani (CEO); Andrew Formica (Chairman)
- Net income: ▲ A$238.8 million (FY2024)
- AUM: A$39.9 billion (31 December 2025)
- Number of employees: 109 (30 Jun 2024)
- Website: magellangroup.com.au

Magellan Financial Group is an Australian investment manager focusing on global equities and global listed infrastructure.

MFG funds are available to retail and institutional clients in both Australian Securities Exchange-listed and unlisted forms. As of 31 January 2025, institutional clients held A$23.1 billion of assets under management, composing 59% of total.

== History ==
MFG was co-founded in 2006 by Hamish Douglass and Chris Mackay off the back of careers in investment banking. The MFG entity was established through a complex recapitalisation deal where an existing listed vehicle—the underperforming Pengana HedgeFunds Group—was taken control of and renamed, severing formal ties with the previous entity. Pengana had been founded in 2003 by Malcolm Turnbull, who was later to become Australian prime minister, and a merchant banking colleague, Russell Pillemar. The Turnbull family retained 20 per cent of the new company after the merger.

Douglass and Mackay used their contacts to raise approximately A$100 million in initial working capital for Magellan and to seed the investment strategies. At the same time, A$378 million was raised to establish the Magellan Flagship Fund in a closed-ended listed investment company structure (ASX code: MFF).

In July 2007, MFG launched the Magellan Global Fund and Magellan Infrastructure Fund as unlisted trusts, providing A$15 million and A$5 million of seed capital respectively.

In December 2021, Brett Cairns resigned from his position as CEO. In March 2022, co-founder Hamish Douglass resigned from the Magellan board and co-founder Chris Mackay took up the role of chairman. David George was appointed CEO in May 2022 but resigned in October 2023 to be replaced by Andrew Formica as Executive Chairman on an interim basis as the company searched for a new CEO. Sophia Rahmani was appointed CEO and managing director of Magellan Financial Group, effective 3 March 2025, following her tenure as managing director of Magellan Asset Management, which she commenced in May 2024.

As at 31 December 2025 Magellan reported A$39.9 billion in funds under management.

== Investments ==
In addition to its primary funds management business, which constitutes the majority of its operations, the Group's balance sheet includes an Associate Investments portfolio (formerly Principal Investments). This portfolio has traditionally comprised internal holdings in Magellan funds. However, in the second half of 2020, MFG began significantly expanding its Associate Investments to include external holdings, initially making three investments. Timeline of Associate Investments:

- Sep 2020: A$156 million investment in Barrenjoey Capital Partners, a newly established full service investment bank start-up (40% non-dilutive economic interest, 5% voting interest).
- Oct 2020: A$20 million investment in FinClear Holdings Limited, a provider of trading technology and infrastructure (16% shareholding).
- Jan 2021: A$95.4 million investment in fast food restaurant chain Guzman y Gomez (11% shareholding). Sold for A$140 million in May 2022 to a unit of Barrenjoey.
- Aug 2024: A$138.5 million investment in Vinva Holdings Limited, an investment management firm (29.5% shareholding).
