= S&P 1500 =

Stock market index

S&P Composite 1500
- Foundation: May 18, 1995; 31 years ago
- Operator: S&P Global
- Exchanges: Nasdaq, NYSE, CBOE
- Trading symbol: SP1500; ^SP1500; ^SPSUPX
- Constituents: 1,505 (May 29, 2026)
- Type: Small, Medium and Large cap
- Market cap: US$73.4 trillion (as of May 29, 2026)
- Weighting method: Market value-weighted
- Related indices: List: S&P 500 S&P 400 S&P 600
- Website: www.spglobal.com/spdji/en/indices/equity/sp-composite-1500

Market caps of S&P 1500 component indices as of August 31, 2026
1. (92.3%) S&P 500: 68,828,211.97
2. (5.08%) S&P MidCap 400: 3,788,135.2
3. (2.61%) S&P SmallCap 600: 1,942,867.17
Values are in US$ millions.

The S&P Composite 1500 Index, more commonly known as the S&P 1500, is a stock market index of US stocks published by S&P Dow Jones Indices. It includes stocks in the S&P 500, S&P 400, and S&P 600 and includes approximately 90% of the market capitalization of U.S. stocks.

Products linked to the S&P 1500 include index funds (exchange-traded funds/ETFs and mutual funds) as well as derivatives (options and futures contracts), which are available for trading in many countries with the goal of replicating the performance of the index. Also available are modified index funds; they replicate the performance of the index with modifications such as the use of covered call strategies, equal weighting, performance buffers, leverage, inclusion of only growth or value stocks, or exclusion of certain sectors, all with the goal of changing the risk/return and yield.

== Other subsets ==
S&P Dow Jones Indices also provides the S&P 900 index (a combination of the S&P 500 index plus the S&P 400) and the S&P 1000 (the S&P MidCap 400 plus the S&P 600 index).

== Selection criteria ==
The components of the index are selected by a committee. When considering the eligibility of a new addition, the committee assesses the company's merit using the following primary criteria:

1. Market capitalization - Market capitalization must be greater than or equal to US$22.7 billion for addition to the S&P 500, between US$8.0 billion and US$22.7 billion for addition to the S&P 400, and between US$1.2 billion and US$ 8.0 billion for addition to the S&P 600 (not for continued eligibility).
2. Market liquidity and public float – Annual dollar value traded to float-adjusted market capitalization is greater than 0.75.
3. Volume – Minimum monthly trading volume of 250,000 shares in each of the six months leading up to the evaluation date
4. Stock exchange – Must be publicly listed on the New York Stock Exchange (including NYSE Arca or NYSE American), Nasdaq (Nasdaq Global Select Market, Nasdaq Select Market or the Nasdaq Capital Market) or Cboe (Cboe BZX, Cboe BYX, Cboe EDGA or Cboe EDGX).
5. Domicile – The company must have its primary listing on a U.S. exchange.
6. Profitability – Net income from continuing operations must be positive for the most recent quarter, and the sum of the most recent four consecutive quarters.
7. Seasoning period – Newly-public companies (via IPO or via SPAC merger, but excepting corporate spin-offs of existing members) are not eligible until they have traded for at least 12 months.
8. Sector balance – The weights in the index of different market sectors (based on grouping members together by their respective GICS sector classifications) would ideally approximate the weights of those sectors among the constituents of the S&P Total Market Index who fulfil the S&P 500's market capitalization criterion.
9. Securities that are ineligible for inclusion in the index are limited partnerships, master limited partnerships and their investment trust units, OTC Bulletin Board issues, closed-end funds, exchange-traded funds, Exchange-traded notes, royalty trusts, tracking stocks, preferred stock, unit trusts, equity warrants, convertible bonds, investment trusts, American depositary receipts, and American depositary shares.

A stock may rise in value when it is added to the index since index funds must purchase that stock to continue tracking the index.

A study published by the National Bureau of Economic Research in October 2021 alleged that companies' purchases of ratings services from S&P Global appear to improve their chance of entering the index, even if they are not the best fit per the rules.

== Annual returns ==
Annual returns have been as follows:

| Year | Price return (excluding dividends) | Total return (including dividends) |
|---|---|---|
| 2025 | 15.51% | 17.02% |
| 2024 | 22.24% | 23.95% |
| 2023 | 23.41% | 25.47% |
| 2022 | −19.12% | −17.78% |
| 2021 | 26.66% | 28.45% |
| 2020 | 15.81% | 17.92% |
| 2019 | 28.34% | 30.90% |
| 2018 | −6.77% | −4.96% |
| 2017 | 18.80% | 21.13% |
| 2016 | 10.65% | 13.03% |
| 2015 | −1.03% | 1.01% |
| 2014 | 10.88% | 13.08% |
| 2013 | 30.12% | 32.80% |
| 2012 | 13.67% | 16.17% |
| 2011 | −0.26% | 1.75% |
| 2010 | 14.17% | 16.38% |
| 2009 | 24.33% | 27.25% |
| 2008 | −38.16% | −36.72% |
| 2007 | 3.60% | 5.47% |
| 2006 | 13.28% | 15.34% |
| 2005 | 3.83% | 5.66% |
| 2004 | 9.96% | 11.78% |

== See also ==
- Russell 3000 – broader US stock market index from FTSE Russell
- Wilshire 5000 – US total stock market index
- S&P 500
- List of S&P 500 companies
- S&P 400
- List of S&P 400 companies
- S&P 600
- List of S&P 600 companies
