= The Global Dow =

Global stock index

The Global Dow (GDOW) is a 150-stock index of corporations from around the world, created by Dow Jones & Company. It consists of multinational blue-chip companies.

Like its progenitor, the Dow Jones Industrial Average (INDU), stocks in The Global Dow are selected by senior editors of The Wall Street Journal. Joining them for this new index were Dow Jones Newswires senior editors in the three major regions of the globe. The Global Dow is bigger—150 stocks rather than 30—and its components are weighted equally rather than by price. All 30 Dow industrial stocks are included, as well as some from the Dow Jones Transportation and Utility averages.

The Global Dow tracks leading companies from around the world in all industries, selected not just for current size and reputation but also for their potential. It covers both developed and emerging markets. In addition, it includes companies from emerging sectors, such as alternative energy. The components are equally weighted, which means that price movements of the larger stocks have no greater impact on index performance than those of the smaller stocks.

The Global Dow is calculated and disseminated in real time by Dow Jones Indexes. Current and closing values can be accessed daily in The Wall Street Journal, and real time at www.djindexes.com. The Base Value is 1000 as of December 31, 2000.

== The Global Dow (GDOW) components ==
- 3M
- ABB
- Abbott Laboratories
- Alcoa
- Allianz
- Amazon
- América Móvil
- Amgen
- American Express
- Anglo American plc
- Anheuser-Busch InBev
- Apple
- ArcelorMittal
- Assicurazioni Generali
- AstraZeneca
- AT&T
- BAE Systems
- Banco Bilbao Vizcaya Argentaria
- Banco Santander
- Bank of America
- Bank of New York Mellon
- BASF
- Baxter International
- Bharti Airtel
- BHP
- BNP Paribas
- Boeing
- Bridgestone
- BP
- Canon
- Carnival Corporation & plc
- Carrefour
- Caterpillar
- Chevron Corporation
- China Construction Bank
- China Mobile
- China Petroleum & Chemical
- China Unicom
- Cisco Systems
- CLP Holdings
- The Coca-Cola Company
- Colgate-Palmolive
- Compagnie de Saint-Gobain
- CEMIG
- Companhia Vale do Rio Doce Pref A
- ConocoPhillips
- Daimler AG
- Deere & Co
- Deutsche Bank
- DuPont
- E.ON
- eBay
- EDP-Energias de Portugal
- Ericsson
- ExxonMobil
- FedEx
- Esprit Holdings
- First Solar
- Freeport-McMoRan
- Gazprom
- GDF Suez
- General Electric
- Gilead Sciences
- GlaxoSmithKline
- Goldman Sachs
- Google
- Hanwha Q Cells
- Hewlett-Packard
- Home Depot
- Honda
- Honeywell
- HSBC(UK registered)
- Hutchison Whampoa
- IBM
- Industrial & Commercial Bank of China
- Infosys
- Johnson & Johnson
- JPMorgan Chase
- Komatsu
- Kraft Foods
- LG Electronics
- LVMH
- McDonald's
- Medtronic
- Merck & Co
- Medco Health Solutions
- Microsoft
- Mitsubishi Corporation
- Mitsubishi UFJ Financial Group
- Mitsui & Co
- Mizuho Financial Group
- Monsanto Company
- Nasdaq
- National Australia Bank
- National Grid plc
- Nestle
- News Corp Cl A
- Nike Cl B
- Nintendo
- Nippon Steel
- Nokia
- Novartis
- Panasonic
- PetroChina
- Petroleo Brasileiro S/A Pref
- Pfizer
- Philip Morris International
- PotashCorp
- Procter & Gamble
- Reliance Industries
- Renewable Energy Corporation
- Rio Tinto
- Roche Holding AG Part. Cert.
- Royal Bank of Canada
- Royal Dutch Shell A
- Samsung
- SAP
- Schlumberger
- Seven & I Holdings
- Siemens
- Société Générale
- Sony
- Southwest Airlines
- SunPower Corp. Cl A
- Suntech Power Holdings
- TSMC
- Takeda Pharmaceutical Company
- Tata Steel
- Telefónica
- Tesco
- Time Warner
- Toshiba
- TotalEnergies
- Toyota
- Travelers
- UBS
- UniCredit
- United Parcel Service Cl B
- United Technologies
- Veolia Environnement
- Verizon Communications
- Vestas
- Vinci
- Visa Cl A
- Vodafone
- Wal-Mart Stores
- Walt Disney Company

== Country allocation ==
Country	%
United States	42.27%
Japan	9.97%
Great Britain	8.30%
France	6.85%
Germany	4.74%
Switzerland	4.62%
China	3.05%
India	2.39%
Spain	2.29%
Hong Kong	2.20%
Brazil	1.86%
Canada	1.64%
South Korea	1.52%
Australia	1.37%
Italy	1.15%
Mexico	0.96%
Taiwan	0.79%
Portugal	0.73%
Finland	0.68%
Sweden	0.64%
Russia	0.54%
Greece	0.44%
Norway	0.40%
Denmark	0.32%
Netherlands	0.29%

== Sector allocation ==
Sector	%
Financials	17.17%
Industrials	13.19%
Consumer Goods	12.27%
Oil & Gas	10.54%
Technology	10.41%
Health Care	10.37%
Consumer Services	9.58%
Basic Materials	6.21%
Telecommunications	5.95%
Utilities	4.30%

== See also ==
- BBC Global 30
- MSCI World
- S&P Global 100
- S&P Global 1200
