= Dow Jones =

Dow Jones is a combination of the names of business partners Charles Dow and Edward Jones.

== Dow Jones & Company ==
Dow, Jones and Charles Bergstresser founded Dow Jones & Company in 1882. That company eventually became a subsidiary of News Corp, and publishes The Wall Street Journal among other publications.

== Stock market indices ==
In 2010, 90% of the Dow Jones Indexes subsidiary was sold to the CME Group. Since 2012, S&P Dow Jones Indices LLC — a joint venture between S&P Global, the CME Group, and News Corp — produces, maintains, licenses, and markets stock market indices.

Among these indices are:

- Dow Jones Industrial Average, one of the most widely utilized indices of the US stock market, measuring the stock performance of 30 large companies
- Dow Jones Transportation Average, the oldest stock index in use
- Dow Jones Utility Average, tracking the performance of 15 prominent U.S. utility companies
- Dow Jones Global Indexes, a family of international equity indexes
- Dow Jones Composite Average, tracking 65 prominent companies
- Dow Jones Global Titans 50

See also:

- S&P 500

== Sustainability indices ==
The Dow Jones Sustainability Indices (DJSI), launched in 1999, are a family of indices evaluating the sustainability performance of thousands of companies.

== See also ==
- The dictionary definition of Dow Jones at Wiktionary
- Dow Jones and the Industrials, an American music band 1979–1981
