= List of S&P 1000 companies =

The S&P 1000 is an index maintained by S&P Dow Jones Indices, a combination of both the mid-cap S&P 400 and small-cap S&P 600 index. The lists of companies within each component may be found at:

- List of S&P 400 companies and
- List of S&P 600 companies
