= Shariq (disambiguation) =

Shariq (Persian: شريق) is a village in Iran.

Shariq, Shareek, Sharique may also refer to:

- Shariq (name)
- Shareek, a 2015 Punjabi musical drama film
- Shareek-e-Hayat, a Pakistani TV series

== See also ==
- Sharik (disambiguation)
