= S&P/TSX 60 =

Canadian stock market index

- Foundation: December 31, 1998; 27 years ago
- Operator: S&P Dow Jones Indices
- Exchanges: Toronto Stock Exchange (TSX)
- Trading symbol: ^TX60; $TXSX; TX60; TX60.TS; SPTSE
- Constituents: 60
- Type: Large-cap
- Related indices: S&P/TSX Composite Index; S&P Global 1200
- Website: www.spglobal.com/spdji/en/indices/equity/sp-tsx-60-index/

The S&P/TSX 60 Index is a stock market index of 60 large companies listed on the Toronto Stock Exchange. Launched on December 30, 1998 by the Canadian S&P Index Committee, a unit of S&P Dow Jones Indices, the index has components across nine sectors of the Canadian economy. The index forms the S&P/TSX Composite Index alongside the S&P/TSX Completion Index, as well as being the Canadian component of the S&P Global 1200.

== Constituents ==
As of January 31, 2026 the constituents were:

Symbol	Company	Sector
AEM	Agnico Eagle Mines Limited	Basic Materials
ATD	Alimentation Couche-Tard Inc.	Consumer Cyclical
BMO	Bank of Montreal	Financial Services
BNS	Bank of Nova Scotia	Financial Services
ABX	Barrick Mining Corporation	Basic Materials
BCE	BCE Inc.	Communication Services
BAM	Brookfield Asset Management Ltd.	Financial Services
BN	Brookfield Corporation	Financial Services
BIP.UN	Brookfield Infrastructure Partners L.P.	Utilities
CAE	CAE Inc.	Industrials
CCO	Cameco Corporation	Energy
CM	Canadian Imperial Bank of Commerce	Financial Services
CNR	Canadian National Railway Company	Industrials
CNQ	Canadian Natural Resources Limited	Energy
CP	Canadian Pacific Kansas City Limited	Industrials
CTC.A	Canadian Tire Corporation Limited	Consumer Cyclical
CCL.B	CCL Industries Inc.	Consumer Cyclical
CLS	Celestica Inc.	Information Technology
CVE	Cenovus Energy Inc.	Energy
GIB.A	CGI Inc.	Information Technology
CSU	Constellation Software Inc.	Information Technology
DOL	Dollarama Inc.	Consumer Staples
EMA	Emera Incorporated	Utilities
ENB	Enbridge Inc.	Energy
FFH	Fairfax Financial Holdings Limited	Financial Services
FM	First Quantum Minerals Ltd.	Basic Materials
FSV	FirstService Corporation	Real Estate
FTS	Fortis Inc.	Utilities
FNV	Franco-Nevada Corporation	Basic Materials
WN	George Weston Limited	Consumer Staples
GIL	Gildan Activewear Inc.	Consumer Cyclical
H	Hydro One Limited	Utilities
IMO	Imperial Oil Limited	Energy
IFC	Intact Financial Corporation	Financial Services
K	Kinross Gold Corporation	Basic Materials
L	Loblaw Companies Limited	Consumer Staples
MG	Magna International Inc.	Consumer Cyclical
MFC	Manulife Financial Corporation	Financial Services
MRU	Metro Inc.	Consumer Staples
NA	National Bank of Canada	Financial Services
NTR	Nutrien Ltd.	Basic Materials
OTEX	Open Text Corporation	Information Technology
PPL	Pembina Pipeline Corporation	Energy
POW	Power Corporation of Canada	Financial Services
QSR	Restaurant Brands International Inc.	Consumer Cyclical
RCI.B	Rogers Communications Inc.	Communication Services
RY	Royal Bank of Canada	Financial Services
SAP	Saputo Inc.	Consumer Staples
SHOP	Shopify Inc.	Information Technology
SLF	Sun Life Financial Inc.	Financial Services
SU	Suncor Energy Inc.	Energy
TRP	TC Energy Corporation	Energy
TECK.B	Teck Resources Limited	Basic Materials
T	Telus Corporation	Communication Services
TRI	Thomson Reuters Corporation	Industrials
TD	Toronto-Dominion Bank	Financial Services
TOU	Tourmaline Oil Corp.	Energy
WCN	Waste Connections Inc.	Industrials
WPM	Wheaton Precious Metals Corp.	Basic Materials
WSP	WSP Global Inc.	Industrials

== Sector weights ==
The weighting of the Global Industry Classification Standard (GICS) as of January 31, 2026 are:

Sector	Weight
Financials	38.5
Energy	16.8
Materials	15.1
Information Technology	9.5
Industrials	8.0
Consumer Staples	3.6
Consumer Discretionary	3.4
Utilities	2.7
Communication Services	2.3
Real Estate	0.2

== TSX 60-based funds ==
The iShares S&P/TSX 60 Index Fund (TSX: XIU) and the Global X S&P/TSX 60 Index ETF (TSX: HXT) are Canadian exchange-traded index funds that are tied to the S&P/TSX 60.

== See also ==
- S&P/TSX Composite Index
- List of companies listed on the Toronto Stock Exchange
- S&P Global 1200
- TSX Venture 50
- Jantzi Social Index
