= Calvert Social Index =

Large cap stock market index

The Calvert Social Index is a stock market index created by Calvert Investments as a benchmark of large companies that are considered socially responsible or ethical. It currently consists of 680 companies, weighted by market capitalization, selected from approximately 1,000 of the largest publicly traded companies in the United States using Calvert's social criteria. These criteria relate to the environment, workplace issues, product safety, community relations, weapons contracting, international operations, and human rights.

This index was created following the success of the Domini 400 Social Index by KLD Research & Analytics, Inc. The Calvert index is used by so-called socially responsible or ESG mutual funds as a benchmark for their performance.

== Top 10 Constituents by index weight ==
Top 10 Constituents by index weight
Constituent	Weight (%)
Apple Inc.	6.59
NVIDIA	5.98
Microsoft Corp	5.68
Amazon.com Inc	3.63
Alphabet Inc A	3.49
Tesla Inc	1.94
Broadcom Inc	1.46
JP Morgan Chase & Co	1.42
Eli Lilly and Company	1.33
UnitedHealth Group Inc	1.15

== See also ==
- FTSE4Good Index
- MSCI KLD 400 Social Index
- Russell 1000 Index
