= Sharik =

Sharik may refer to:

== Dog name ==
- Sharik, a fictional dog in Bulgakov's novel Heart of a Dog
- Sharik, a fictional dog in Dostoevsky's The House of the Dead
- Sharik (Szarik in Polish spelling), a fictional dog in Janusz Przymanowski's Four Tank-Men and a Dog
- Sharik, a fictional dog in Three from Prostokvashino

== Other ==
- Sharik, the unofficial designation of the landing unit of Vostok and Voskhod spacecraft
- Sharīk Peninsula, Tunisia
- Sharik ibn Hudayr al-Taghlibi, companion of the Ali, the Caliph of the Rashidun Caliphate

== See also ==
- Shariq (disambiguation)
- Shareek, a 2015 Indian Punjabi-language film
  - Shareek 2, its 2022 sequel film
