= S&P Asia 50 =

Stock index of Asian stocks

- Foundation: November 13, 2007
- Operator: S&P Dow Jones Indices
- Trading symbol: IAA
- Constituents: 50
- Weighting method: Modified Weighted Market Cap
- Related indices: Dow Jones Industrial Average
- Website: Official website
- ISIN: AU000000IAA6
- Reuters: IAA.AX at Reuters
- Bloomberg: IAA.AX at Bloomberg

The S&P Asia 50 Index is a stock index of Asian blue chip stocks that is a part of the S&P Global 1200. The index includes companies listed on the stock exchanges in Hong Kong, South Korea, Singapore, and Taiwan. This index has an exchange-traded fund (ETF) in the United States (NYSE Arca: AIA) and in Australia (ASX: IAA).

== Constituents ==
As of 23 October 2026

Company	Ticker	Weight (%)	Industry	Country
AIA Group	SEHK: 1299	1.58	Financial	Hong Kong
Alibaba Group Holding	SEHK: 9988	4.17	Consumer Discretionary	Hong Kong
ASE Technology Holding	TWSE: 3711	1.16	Information Technology	Taiwan
Baidu	SEHK: 9888	0.36	Communication	Hong Kong
Bank of China	SEHK: 3988	1.07	Financial	China
BeOne Medicines AG	SEHK: 6160	0.47	Health Care	China
BYD	SEHK: 1211	0.57	Consumer Discretionary	China
Cathay Financial Holding	TWSE: 2882	0.58	Financial	Taiwan
China Construction Bank	SEHK: 939	2.06	Financial	China
China Life Insurance Company	SEHK: 2628	0.37	Financial	China
China Merchants Bank	SEHK: 3968	0.36	Financial	China
CK Hutchison Holdings	SEHK: 1	0.38	Industrials	Hong Kong
CTBC Financial Holding	TWSE: 2891	0.76	Financial	Taiwan
DBS Group	SGX: D05	2.01	Financial	Singapore
Delta Electronic	TWSE: 2308	1.55	Information Technology	Taiwan
Doosan Enerbility	KRX: 034020	0.34	Industrials	South Korea
Elite Material	TWSE: 2383	0.85	Information Technology	Taiwan
Fubon Financial Holding	TWSE: 2881	0.74	Financial	Taiwan
Hanhwa Aeorspace	KRX: 012450	0.33	Industrials	South Korea
Hong Kong Exchanges and Clearing	SEHK: 388	0.88	Financial	Hong Kong
Hon Hai Precision Industry	TWSE: 2317	1.54	Information Technology	Taiwan
Hyundai Motor Company	KRX: 005380	0.50	Consumer Discretionary	South Korea
Industrial and Commercial Bank of China	SEHK: 1398	1.24	Financial	China
JD.com	SEHK: 9618	0.53	Consumer Discretionary	China
KB Financial Group	KRX: 105560	0.64	Financial	South Korea
Kia Corporation	KRX: 000270	0.32	Consumer Discretionary	South Korea
MediaTek	TWSE: 2454	3.31	Information Technology	Taiwan
Meituan	SEHK: 3690	0.86	Consumer Discretionary	China
Nan Ya Plastics Corporation	TWSE: 1303	0.89	Materials	Taiwan
Naver	KRX: 035420	0.34	Communication	South Korea
NetEase	SEHK: 9999	0.70	Communication	China
Oversea-Chinese Banking	SGX: O39	1.46	Financial	Singapore
PetroChina	SEHK: 857	0.43	Energy	China
Ping An Insurance	SEHK: 2318	0.69	Financial	China
Samsung Electronics	KRX: 005930	12.47	Information Technology	South Korea
Samsung Electronics (Non-voting)	KRX: 005935	1.71	Information Technology	South Korea
Shinhan Financial Group	KRX: 055550	0.49	Financial	South Korea
Singapore Telecommunications	SGX: Z74	0.44	Communication	Singapore
SK Hynix	KRX: 000660	9.47	Information Technology	South Korea
SK Square	KRX: 402340	0.88	Industrials	South Korea
Sun Hung Kai Properties	SEHK: 16	0.35	Real Estate	Hong Kong
Taiwan Semiconductor Manufacturing	TWSE: 2330	29.63	Information Technology	Taiwan
Techtronic Industries	SEHK: 669	0.40	Industrials	China
Tencent Holdings	SEHK: 700	5.12	Communication	China
Trip.com Group	SEHK: 9961	0.40	Consumer Discretionary	China
TS Financial Holdings	TWSE: 2887	0.54	Financial	Taiwan
United Microelectronics Corporation	SGX: 2303	0.76	Information Technology	Singapore
United Overseas Bank	SGX: U11	0.78	Financial	Singapore
Xiaomi	SEHK: 1810	1.00	Information Technology	China
Yuanta Financial Holding	TWSE: 2885	0.52	Financial	Taiwan
Zijin Mining	SEHK: 2899	0.38	Materials	China
