= Amy Domini =

American investment adviser and author

- Born: January 25, 1950 (age 76); New York City, US
- Occupations: Investor, author
- Known for: Social investing

Amy Lee Domini (born January 25, 1950) is an American investment adviser and author known for her work in social investing.

== Early life and education ==
Amy Lee Domini was born on January 25, 1950, in New York City, to Margot Cabot (Colt), a teacher, and Enzo Vice Domini, who owned a food-processing business. Domini's great-grandfather Joseph Lee was the author of Constructive and Preventive Philanthropy (Macmillan, 1902). Domini grew up in Newtown, Connecticut, and received a BA from Boston University in 1973.

== Career ==
After college, Domini began work as a copy-clerk for brokerage firm Tucker Anthony, and rose through the ranks quickly to become a retail broker. She began working in socially responsible investing in 1980. She is the founder and chief executive officer of Domini Impact Investments and one of the founders of KLD Research & Analytics, a research firm. In 1990 with partners Peter Kinder and Steve Lyndenberg, she created the Domini 400 Social Index, a stock market index selected according to social and environmental standards. In 1991 she founded the Domini Social Impact Equity Fund, an index fund based on the Domini 400 Social Index. The fund held $1.3 billion in assets as of 2001 and over its first ten years rose 15.08 percent compared with 15.25 percent growth for the S&P 500 in the same period. Only 25 percent of all funds performed on par with the S&P in that period and the success of Domini's fund helped establish socially responsible investing as compatible with strong financial returns, where previously the field was seen as low-performing in this respect.

In 2005, Time named Domini to its list of the world's most influential people.

Domini is the author of books including Socially Responsible Investing: Making a Difference and Making Money and The Challenges of Wealth. She is the coauthor of Investing for Good, The Social Investment Almanac, and Ethical Investing.

Domini served on the boards of the Church Pension Fund of the Episcopal Church; the National Association of Community Development Loan Funds, an organization whose members work to create funds for grassroots economic development loans; and the Interfaith Center on Corporate Responsibility.

== Personal life ==
Domini was married to Peter Kinder from 1980 to 1997; she later remarried. She has two sons.

== Works cited ==
- Caplan, Sheri J. (2013). "Amy Domini". Petticoats and Pinstripes: Portraits of Women in Wall Street's History. Praeger. pp. 169–179. ISBN 978-1-4408-0265-2. OCLC 821025020.
