= S&P Latin America 40 =

Stock market index

The S&P Latin America 40 is a stock market index from S&P Dow Jones Indices. It tracks Latin American stocks.

The S&P Latin America 40 is one of seven headline indices making up S&P Global 1200 and includes highly liquid securities from economic sectors of Mexican and South American equity markets. Companies from Brazil, Chile, Colombia, Mexico and Peru are represented in this index. Representing approximately 70% of each country's market capitalization, this index provides coverage of the large cap, liquid constituents of each key country in Latin America.

The S&P Latin America 40 is maintained by the S&P Index Committee, whose members include Standard and Poor's economists and index analysts. The goal of the Index Committee is to ensure that the S&P Latin America 40 remains an accurate measure of Latin American markets, reflecting the risk and return characteristics of the broader universe on an ongoing basis. As of 2010, S&P Latin America 40 consisted of forty companies with a market capitalization of US$450.07 billion.

There is an ETF tracking this index (NYSE Arca: ILF).

== Constituent companies ==
As of 20 January 2022, the constituent stocks of the S&P Latin America 40 are:

Company name	Ticker symbol	GICS	Industry	Country
AmBev	NYSE: ABEV	30	Consumer Staples	Brazil
América Móvil	BMV: AMX L	50	Communication Services	Mexico
B3	B3: B3SA3	40	Financials	Brazil
Banco Bradesco	NYSE: BBD	40	Financials	Brazil
Banco Santander Chile	NYSE: BSAC	40	Financials	Chile
Banco de Chile	BCS: CHILE	40	Financials	Chile
Banco do Brasil	B3: BBAS3	40	Financials	Brazil
Bancolombia	NYSE: CIB	40	Financials	Colombia
BRF S.A.	NYSE: BRFS	30	Consumer Staples	Brazil
CCR S.A.	B3: CCRO3	20	Industrials	Brazil
Cemex	BMV: CEMEX CPO	15	Materials	Mexico
Cencosud	BCS: CENCOSUD	30	Consumer Staples	Chile
Credicorp	NYSE: BAP	40	Financials	Peru
Ecopetrol	NYSE: EC	10	Energy	Colombia
Empresas CMPC	BCS: CMPC	15	Materials	Chile
Empresas Copec	BCS: COPEC	10	Energy	Chile
Enel Américas	NYSE: ENIA	55	Utilities	Chile
Fomento Económico Mexicano (FEMSA)	BMV: FEMSA UBD	30	Consumer Staples	Mexico
Fibra Uno	BMV: FUNO 11	60	Real Estate	Mexico
Gerdau	NYSE: GGB	15	Materials	Brazil
Grupo Financiero Banorte	BMV: GFNORTE O	40	Financials	Mexico
Grupo México	BMV: GMEXICO B	15	Materials	Mexico
Grupo Televisa	BMV: TLEVISA CPO	25	Consumer Discretionary	Mexico
Interconexión Eléctrica	BVC: ISA	55	Utilities	Colombia
Itaú Unibanco	NYSE: ITUB	40	Financials	Brazil
Itaúsa Investimentos Itau	B3: ITSA4	40	Financials	Brazil
Localiza Rent A Car	B3: RENT3	20	Industrials	Brazil
Lojas Renner	B3: LREN3	25	Consumer Discretionary	Brazil
Magazine Luiza	B3: MGLU3	25	Consumer Discretionary	Brazil
Natura & Co	B3: NTCO3	30	Consumer Staples	Brazil
PagSeguro	NYSE: PAGS	45	Information Technology	Brazil
Petrobras	NYSE: PBR; NYSE: PBR.A	10	Energy	Brazil
Rede D'Or São Luiz	B3: RDOR3	35	Health Care	Brazil
S.A.C.I. Falabella	BCS: FALABELLA	25	Consumer Discretionary	Chile
Sociedad Química y Minera de Chile	NYSE: SQM	15	Materials	Chile
Southern Copper Corp.	NYSE: SCCO	15	Materials	Peru
StoneCo	NYSE: STNE	45	Information Technology	Brazil
Vale	NYSE: VALE.P	15	Materials	Brazil
Wal-Mart de México	BMV: WALMEX*	30	Consumer Staples	Mexico
WEG Industries	B3: WEGE3	20	Industrials	Brazil

== Country coverage ==
As of 15 October 2024, the country coverage is the following:

Country	No. of companies	Country weight
Brazil	17	62.6%
Mexico	10	24.2%
Chile	9	6.5%
Peru	2	5%
Colombia	3	1.7%
Total	41	100.0%

== See also ==
- Economy of Brazil - B3
- Economy of Chile - Santiago Stock Exchange
- Economy of Mexico - Mexican Stock Exchange
- Economy of Peru - Lima Stock Exchange
- Economy of Colombia - Colombia Stock Exchange
