= S&P BSE 500 Shariah Index =

Indian stock market index

- Foundation: 27 December 2010
- Operator: S&P Dow Jones Indices
- Exchanges: Bombay Stock Exchange
- Constituents: 500
- Type: Large cap
- Weighting method: free-float

The S&P BSE 500 Shariah Index is an Indian stock market index that represent all Shariah compliant companies of the broad-based S&P BSE 500 index. The index is part of the family of S&P Shariah indices with the S&P 500 Shariah, S&P Europe 350 Shariah, and S&P Pan Asia Shariah among others. The S&P BSE 500 consists of 500 of the largest, most liquid Indian stocks trading at the Bombay Stock Exchange (BSE). The index represents nearly 93% of the total market capitalization on the exchange across a broad range of industries.

== History ==
The Index was established on 27 December 2010 on the Bombay Stock Exchange, in collaboration with the Taqwaa Advisory and Shariah Investment Solutions (TASIS). They launched an Islamic index in a bid to attract more investors from India and overseas. On 19 February 2013, S&P Dow Jones Indices and the Bombay Stock Exchange ("BSE") announced their strategic partnership to calculate, disseminate, and license the widely followed BSE suite of indices. One of the first indices created by the partnership was the S&P BSE 500 SHARIAH. In line with other S&P BSE indices, on 16 August 2005 the calculation methodology was changed to the free-float methodology.
