= Shariq (name) =

Shariq, Sharique or Sharik (Arabic: شارق) means rising from East (شرق), an indirect reference to the Sun. It is a Muslim name also mentioned in the Quran. Shareek (Arabic: شریک) means "Companion" or "Partner". Notable people with the name include:

== Given name ==
- Sharik Ibn-e-Judair, 7th century Arabic military
- Shariq Hassan (born 1994), Indian actor
- Shariq Nisar (born 1974), Indian finance professional, academic and activist

== Surname ==
- Akhnas ibn Shariq, a contemporary to Muhammad and a leader of Mecca
- Sharifuddin Shariq (born 1935), Indian politician
- Qurra ibn Sharik al-Absi (died 715), governor of Egypt in 709–715
