= ECODES =

Independent environmental non-profit organization

- Formation: March 10, 1992; 34 years ago
- Type: NGO
- Purpose: Ecological, sustainable development
- Headquarters: Spain (Zaragoza); Plaza San Bruno 9
- Region served: Spain, Latin America
- Official language: Spanish
- President: Jose Ángel Ruperez
- Main organ: Board
- Website: http://www.ecodes.org

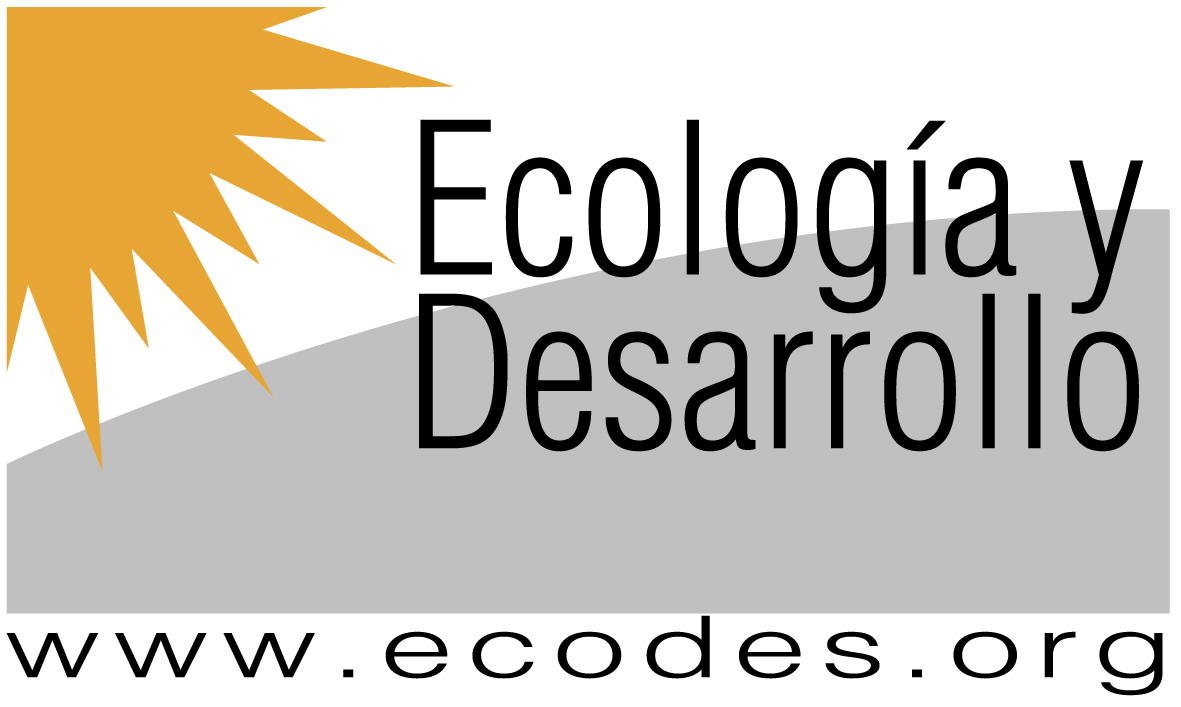
ECODES Logo

ECODES (Spanish: Fundación Ecología y Desarrollo) is an independent non-profit organization that works towards sustainable and environmentally friendly development, founded on 10 March 1992.

The organization's main areas of focus are social responsibility, climate change resulting from global warming, water management, reducing consumption and development cooperation. Besides their various projects they publish an online magazine, esPosible.

== History ==
ECODES was established on 10 March 1992 in Zaragoza, Spain, with the intent to find solutions to shared problems and bring about social change. Since then the foundation has gained in significance, winning various awards for their plans, programs and actions.

== Ideology ==
ECODES is not associated with any political party. Their aim is to bring about social change by moving society in a more socially just and ecologically sustainable direction.

== Areas of work ==
ECODES analyzes the causes and consequences of major socio-environmental challenges and prescribes solutions.

Geographically they are active in Spain and Latin America. In the Northern Hemisphere they concentrate their work on transforming existing economic and social structures and in the Southern Hemisphere, especially Latin America, they offer expertise and assistance in technical matters and funding.

Areas of work, often overlapping, are amongst others:

- Water: sustainable use of water resources; spearheaded the creation and management of "Alianza por el Agua".
- Corporate social responsibility: this includes analyzing companies social responsibility record and initiate campaigns against Corruption
- Climate change: campaigns of alert about global warming
- Responsible Consumption: denouncing the waste caused by a productivist economy, promoting Fair trade and responsible consumption
- International development cooperation: Since 1994 ECODES has been active in the field of development cooperation. They fund projects for demonstration purposes, offer expertise and technical knowledge and assists their overseas partners in matters of funding. (Also see Development Cooperation chapter below.)

== Campaigns and Initiatives ==
ECODES gained significant notoriety due to their “Zaragoza, water-saving city” campaign. It started in 1997 and it aimed to promote a new water-saving consciousness through a more efficient management. It emphasized, above all, the importance of simple technological change to achieve a sustainable reduction in water consumption. The project was to issue a challenge to the city: to save 1,000 million liters of domestic water consumption in one year. The project has shown that it is possible to deal with the shortage of water in cities, using a cheap, ecological, fast and contentious-free approach, by increasing efficiency in consumption. For this campaign ECODES teamed up with local and regional governments as well as the European Union. (see press dossier and a summary of the campaign at the page provided here)

In 2005 ECODES entered into a partnership with Fundación Natura to develop the program CeroCO2. It is a comprehensive program that aims to promote action against global climate change amongst all relevant stakeholders in society, including individuals, businesses, NGOs and governmental entities. CeroCO2 offers tools to calculate reduce and offset greenhouse gas emissions in renewable energy, energy efficiency and reforestation projects in developing countries. It aims to ensure that improvements in living standards in these countries do not pose a further threat to the world's climate. The project features an interactive web platform and was designed and developed by the two non-profit organizations with the assistance of the INCAE Business School.

In 2008 ECODES spearheaded the project "Piensaenclima" with support from the Spanish Ministry of Environment. ECODES started a pilot project to test methodologies for analyzing the climate change policies of enterprises. They compared different commonly used methodologies for the analysis of climate change policies, mostly aimed at providing information to the financial markets (Carbon Disclosure Project, GHG Protocol, etc.). ECODES then contacted the US, not-for-profit organization Climate Counts and became their Spanish partner because of the convincing methodology in rating companies developed by Climate Counts. The project "Piensaenclima" also features a free mobile phone application for consumers, who wish to be informed about the climate and social responsibility practices of many of Spain's biggest companies.

For the Expo 2008 in Zaragoza, Spain, ECODES was tasked with organizing and managing the citizens' initiative pavilion called “the beacon” (Spanish: el faro). They helped bring together various non-governmental organizations and organized the various shows and discussions about water and sustainable development. ECODES (Fundación Ecología y Desarrollo) was also a member of the permanent commission of all the participating groups. The permanent commission included:

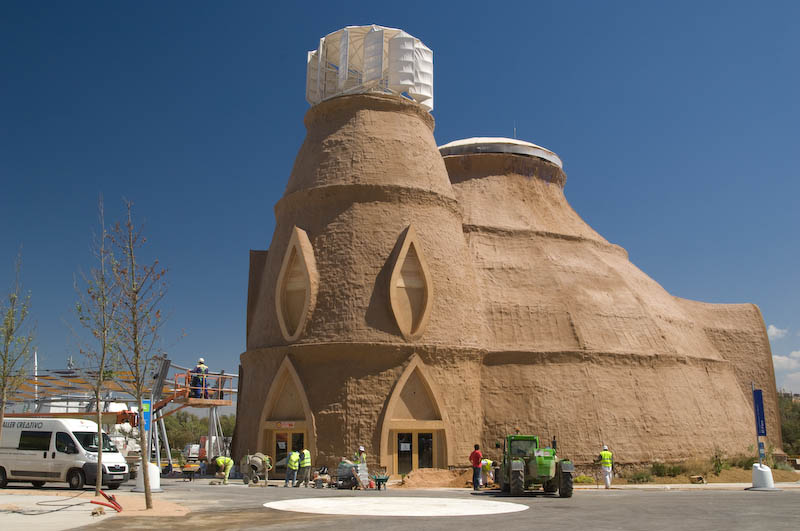
Construction phase of "El faro" pavilion for the 2008 Expo in Zaragoza, Spain

- Cruz Roja Española
- Ecología y Desarrollo
- Fundación Nueva Cultura del Agua
- Ingeniería sin Fronteras
- Intermon Oxfam
- Sustainlabour
- WWF/Adena

In January 2010 ECODES launched a free, online magazine called esPosible. It features stories about climate change and sustainable development and offers the reader chances to get involved in particular projects. Furthermore, it highlights exemplary (“best practice”) programs across the world in order to promote their adaptation in Spain. Titles have included (originally in Spanish):

- (January 2010 issue) Business and climate change
- (February 2010 issue) Green employment
- (March 2010 issue) Water and cooperation
- (April 2010 issue) A responsible shopping basket
- (May 2010 issue) Tourism without a trace
- (June 2010 issue) Cities and energy

== Partnerships and cooperation ==
ECODES has partnerships and joined networks with many other environmental or social organizations and is a member of numerous coalitions like the "Coalición Clima". ECODES is also a member of the Spanish Association of Foundations (Spanish: La Asociación Española de Fundaciones).

In 2002 ECODES joined the not-for-profit organization EIRIS (Ethical Investment Research Services) as an analyst partner. Having already branched out into ethical investment research since 1997 ECODES now shares the data it collects with EIRIS in order to contribute to this global database and help clients such as asset owners, asset managers, banks, stock brokers and governments around the world to invest responsibly. ECODES analyses the environmental and social governance policies and practices of listed companies from Spain, Portugal, Brazil and Mexico and supplies EIRIS with the collected data. Furthermore, ECODES is responsible for conducting the sustainability analysis for several stock indexes, including the FTSE4Good Index and the FTSE4Good IBEX indexes.

In 2005 ECODES and several partners joined to set up the Asociación del Sello de Productos de Comercio Justo (ASPCJ). The ASPCJ is the Spanish member of FLO International, which unites 23 Fairtrade producer and labelling initiatives across Europe, Asia, Latin America, North America, Africa, Australia and New Zealand.

Since 2008 ECODES is a partner of the non-governmental Carbon Disclosure Project (CDP). The CDP maintains the world's largest database of corporate information on climate change. Through an annual survey of the largest quoted companies, CDP collects information on identified risks and opportunities relating to climate change, emissions reduction plans and the transparency of corporate actions to mitigate climate change.

== Development cooperation ==
ECODES is engaged in various projects overseas with a strong focus on Latin America. They fund projects for demonstration purposes and help overseas NGOs to secure funding from the local and national Spanish government as well as private donors and the European Union. They also offer expertise and technical knowledge to their overseas partners. Currently and in the past ECODES has been active in the following countries with the following partners (amongst others):

- Algeria

Association Chlorophylle pour la Protection de l'Environnement

- Argentina

Fundación Vida Silvestre Argentina –FVSA & Inclusión Social Sustentable

- Bolivia

Protección del Medio Ambiente Tarija – PROMETA

- Brazil

Instituto Permacultura da Amazônia (IPA)

- Ecuador
- El Salvador

Asociación Comunitaria Unida por el Agua y la Agricultura – ACUA & Asociación de Saneamiento Básico, Educación Sanitaria y Energías Alternativas – SABES

- Guatemala

Asociación para la Promoción y el Desarrollo de la Comunidad – CEIBA

- Honduras

Comunicación Comunitaria COMUN

- India

Wind power generation in India, supporting the "Voluntary Carbon Standard"

- Madagascar

Supporting the conservation of the rainforest in the Makira Natural Park, Madagascar.

- Mexico

Fondo para la Paz

- Nicaragua

Alcaldía Municipal de León & Asociación de Educación y Comunicación “La Cuculmeca” & Asociación Hermanamiento León (Nicaragua) – Zaragoza (España)& Asociación para el Desarrollo Municipal del Norte - ADEMNORTE & Cafenica *Centro de Información y Servicios de Asesoría en Salud –CISAS- & Centro de Promoción del Desarrollo Local – Ceprodel & Ciprés -Centro para la Promoción, la Investigación y el Desarrollo Rural y Social- & Cooperativa de Servicios de Exportación e Importación Nicaragüense “Del Campo” & Cooperativa Multisectorial “Juan Francisco Paz Silva” & Fundación Desarrollo Integral Asociado – DIA & Instituto Politécnico La Salle & MINSA & Universidad Nacional Autónoma de Nicaragua – UNAN-León

- Peru

Centro de Educación y Comunicación “Guaman Poma de Ayala” & IPES – Promoción del Desarrollo Sostenible

== Transparency ==
In order to promote transparency and good practices, ECODES joined the Fundación Lealtad, which analyzes and rates NGOs according to their “Standards of Transparency and Best Practices”. These standards are used to benchmark the transparency and best practices of non-profit organizations. Both the analysis and compliance are voluntary. According to Fundación Lealtad's report ECODES complies with all transparency and best practice principles. The report also shows that 90.2% of all available funds in 2007 went directly towards fulfilling the aims of ECODES. The full 2008 report on ECODES (in Spanish) including finances, donors, areas of work and internal policies can be downloaded from the website of Fundación Lealtad.

== Awards ==
The work of the foundation has been recognized on the local, national and international level. An incomplete selection of these recognitions and awards is listed below.

•2008. Awarded the “Consumer Research Award” of the Government of Aragon for the paper "Virtual water and food, Responsible Consumption in Aragon"

•2008. Ebrópolis 2008 Award for good citizenship practices granted to Ecology and Development Foundation for the proposal "Zaragoza, Water 100.000 saving compromise"

•2005. 21 Action Prize awarded by the City Council for the project CeroCO2 in recognition of individuals and institutions working in the field of sustainability.

•2005. The European Commission Vice President Margot Wallström, decided to donate to the Foundation Ecology and Development.

•2004. Awarded the “Félix de Azara Prize” in recognition of the contribution of the foundation to build a development-friendly environment.

•2003. The campaign "Zaragoza water saving city. 50 Good Practices "was awarded the "Juan de la Cosa of Environmental Engineering Award"

•2003. Ecology and Development Foundation received an award from ISR from the Institute for Sustainable Resources for their outstanding contribution to and compliance with the principles of sustainable development (May 2003)

•2002. The "Water Efficiency Program in the Cities" was recognized at the Sixth National Environmental Conference

•2002. The campaign "Zaragoza, Water Saving City” was chosen by the UN Habitat Agenda, in its fourth edition as one of 100 examples of successful sustainable urban management in the world.

•2001. The campaign "Zaragoza, Water Saving City” was chosen by the UN Habitat Programme as one of the 84 examples of successful sustainable urban management in the world.

•1999. Award City, Urbanism and Environment for the campaign "Zaragoza, Water Saving City" organized annually by the Basque-Navarra Group Architects Planners, Architects Association of the Basque-Navarra, Fundación BBV, the Government Vasto, the Navarro Government and the University of the Basque Country.

•1999. The project "Zaragoza, Water Saving City" was awarded the Special Mention Prize in the Alhambra-Water and Environment organized by the UNESCO Chair in Sustainable Development and Environment at the University of Granada and the Coca-Cola Foundation Spain.

•1999 The "Zaragoza, Water Saving City 'was awarded a second prize in recognition of young people working in conservation and environmental improvement in the Young and Bright Award.

•1998. Award for "advertising design" in the category "Non-Profit." For the campaign "Zaragoza, Water Saving City", awarded by the Spanish Association of Direct Marketing.

•1998. Selection of the "Zaragoza, Water Saving City/Zaragoza, Ciudad Ahorradora de Agua" as one of the 100 best experiments in the world by an international jury of the United Nations.

•1998. The project "Zaragoza, Water Saving City" is awarded the Henry Ford Award in the conservation category by the Ford Foundation-Spain.
