= Social Venture Network =

- Founded: 1987
- Purpose: Sustainable Business
- Location: San Francisco, California
- Method: Networking
- Key people: Joshua Mailman & Wayne Silby, Co-Founders; Deb Nelson, Executive Director
- Website: http://www.svn.org

Social Venture Network (SVN) is a nonprofit membership organization founded in 1987 by Joshua Mailman, Thomas H. Stoner Jr and Wayne Silby, SVN.

== Events ==
Social Venture Network hosts two annual conferences, one on the West Coast in Spring and one on the East Coast in Fall, in addition to local gatherings held throughout the year.

== Members ==
Some past and current members of Social Venture Network include:

- Thomas H. Stoner Jr. - Entelligent
- Ben Cohen - Ben and Jerry's
- Amy Domini - Domini Social Investments
- Eileen Fisher - Eileen Fisher, Inc.
- Paul Hawken - Smith & Hawken
- Gary Hirshberg - Stonyfield Farm
- Jeffrey Hollender - Seventh Generation Inc.
- Adam Lowry - Method
- Anita Roddick - The Body Shop

== Awards ==
SVN's Innovation Awards began in 2007 as a way to provide scholarships through its Bridge Project to emerging social entrepreneurs to help scale and expand their impact. Honorees have included TerraCycle, Back to the Roots, Revolution Foods, World of Good, Root Capital, and Green for All, among others. Several of the Innovation Awards winners have also been honored as Echoing Green Fellows, Hitachi Foundation Yoshiyama Young Entrepreneurs, White House Champions of Change, and have been listed on the Forbes Impact 30.

== Sister organizations ==
SVN has been identified as inspiration and catalyst by several other successful organizations in the business ethics and corporate social responsibility spheres, including B Lab, Investors' Circle, Net Impact, Business Alliance for Local Living Economies (BALLE), Social Enterprise Alliance (SEA), Business for Social Responsibility (BSR) and Bainbridge Graduate Institute.

== Resources ==
=== Book series ===
In 2004, SVN began a partnership with publishers Berrett-Koehler to create the SVN Book Series. The books are written by SVN members as practical guides to starting and growing a socially responsible business.

=== Social Venture Institutes ===
Founded in 1996 by Gary Hirshberg, President and CEO of Stonyfield Farm, Social Venture Institutes are offered twice each year as a forum in which business and nonprofit leaders may receive expert advice and mentoring to overcome pressing challenges and to explore ways to succeed.

=== Esalen ===
The Esalen Institute was founded in 1962 as an alternative educational center. In 2011, Social Venture Network began its partnership with Esalen to offer a series of workshops on business practices, designed to help business professionals lead with passion, insight and authenticity.

== Sustainability ==
The Social Venture Network office is located in the Presidio of San Francisco, California in the Thoreau Center for Sustainability and is a Certified Green Business. SVN publishes tools and best practices with B Corp Certification, as well as a Sustainable Shopping Guide.
