= Dow Jones Global Titans 50 =

Stock market index

- Foundation: July 14, 1999; 27 years ago
- Operator: S&P Dow Jones Indices
- Trading symbol: .DJGT
- Constituents: 55
- Market cap: ▲USD$230,709.11 million
- Weighting method: Modified Market Cap Weighted
- Related indices: Dow Jones Industrial Average
- Website: https://www.spglobal.com/spdji/en/indices/equity/dow-jones-global-titans-50-index/#overview
- Reuters: .DJGT

The Dow Jones Global Titans 50 index is a float-adjusted stock index comprising 50 of the largest (by market capitalization) and best known blue chip companies traded on the New York Stock Exchange, American Stock Exchange, Nasdaq, Euronext, London Stock Exchange, and Tokyo Stock Exchange. The index represents the biggest and most liquid stocks traded in individual countries. It was created by Dow Jones Indexes to reflect the globalization of international blue chip securities in the wake of mergers and the creation of megacorporations.

The DJ Global Titans 50 is part of the Dow Jones Global Titans Indexes. They are large cap companies with at least some of their operations outside of their domestic markets. Each index is constructed by selecting stocks from the corresponding benchmark indexes of the Dow Jones Global Indexes.

Dow Jones also offers the Dow Jones Sector Titans Indexes, which are global indexes covering large-cap stocks in sectors such as financial services, chemicals, industrial goods and services, energy, consumer goods, and noncyclical goods and services.

== Statistics ==
As of July 19, 2019 the DJ Global Titans 50 had a total market capitalization valued at US$230,709.11 million and a total return of 15.23 percent over the last three years.

== Composition ==
As of August 2026, there are 53 constituents that make up the DJGT, this is caused by certain companies, like Alphabet, having multiple constituents within the index.

Dow Jones Global Titans 50 Components
Country	Corporation	Ticker	Industry
United States	Abbot Laboratories	NYSE: ABT	Pharmaceutical
United States	AbbVie	NYSE: ABBV	Pharmaceutical
Ireland	Accenture	NYSE: ACN	Professional services
United States	Alphabet	Nasdaq: GOOG; Nasdaq: GOOGL	Technology
United States	Amazon	Nasdaq: AMZN	Technology
United States	Apple	Nasdaq: AAPL	Technology
United Kingdom	AstraZeneca	Nasdaq: AZN	Pharmaceutical
United States	Broadcom	Nasdaq: AVGO	Technology
United States	Caterpillar	NYSE: CAT	Machinery
United States	Chevron Corporation	NYSE: CVX	Energy
United States	Cisco	Nasdaq: CSCO	Technology
United States	Coca-Cola	NYSE: KO	Food & Beverage
United States	Eli Lilly	NYSE: LLY	Pharmaceutical
United States	ExxonMobil	NYSE: XOM	Energy
United States	GE Aerospace	NYSE: GE	Aerospace & Defense
United States	Goldman Sachs	NYSE: GS	Banking
United Kingdom	HSBC	LSE: HSBA	Banking
United States	IBM	NYSE: IBM	Technology
United States	Johnson & Johnson	NYSE: JNJ	Pharmaceutical
United States	JPMorgan Chase	NYSE: JPM	Banking
United States	Mastercard	NYSE: MA	Banking
United States	McDonald's	NYSE: MCD	Restaurant
United States	Merck & Co.	NYSE: MRK	Pharmaceutical
United States	Meta	Nasdaq: FB	Technology
United States	Microsoft	Nasdaq: MSFT	Technology
Switzerland	Nestlé	SIX: NESN	Food & Beverage
United States	Netflix	Nasdaq: NFLX	Entertainment
Switzerland	Novartis	NYSE: NOVN	Pharmaceutical
United States	Nvidia	Nasdaq: NVDA	Technology
Denmark	Novo Nordisk	Nasdaq Copenhagen: NOVO B	Pharmaceutical
United States	Oracle Corporation	NYSE: ORCL	Technology
United States	PepsiCo	Nasdaq: PEP	Food & Beverage
United States	Pfizer	NYSE: PFE	Health Care
United States	Philip Morris International	NYSE: PM	Tobacco
United States	Procter & Gamble	NYSE: PG	Consumer Goods
Switzerland	Roche	SIX: ROG, SIX: ROP	Health Care
Canada	Royal Bank of Canada	TSX: RY	Banking
United States	Salesforce	NYSE: CRM	Technology
South Korea	Samsung Electronics	KRX: 005930, 005935	Conglomerate
Germany	SAP	FWB: SAP	Technology
United Kingdom	Shell	Euronext: RDSA	Oil & Gas
United States	Tesla	Nasdaq: TSLA	Technology
United States	Thermo Fisher Scientific	NYSE: TMO	Pharmaceutical
Japan	Toyota	TYO: 7203	Automobiles & Parts
Taiwan	TSMC	NYSE: TSM	Technology
United Kingdom	Unilever	LSE: ULVR	Consumer Goods
United States	Visa	NYSE: V	Banking

== See also ==
- S&P Dow Jones Indices
- Dow Jones Industrial Average
- S&P Global 100
- BBC Global 30
