= BBC Global 30 =

Stock market index

- Foundation: 2004
- Operator: BBC, FTSE
- Trading symbol: BBC30
- Constituents: 30
- Weighting method: Modified Market Cap Weighted
- Website: www.bbc.co.uk

The BBC Global 30 was a worldwide stock market index, run as a global economic barometer. Started by the BBC on 29 September 2004 and last updated on 31 December 2019, it mixed the economic information of 30 of the world's largest companies based in three continents. It proved to be very volatile, as many of the companies had major gains and losses during the index's lifetime.

== Constituents ==
The companies in the index (since 2013) are:

BBC Global 30 Components
Country	Company	Ticker	Industry
United States	Apple	Nasdaq: AAPL	Consumer Electronics
United States	AT&T	NYSE: T	Telecommunications
Germany	BASF	FWB: BAS	Chemicals
United States	Berkshire Hathaway	NYSE: BRK.B	Conglomerate
Australia	BHP	LSE: BHP	Mining & Energy
Japan	Canon	TYO: 7751	Consumer Electronics
Hong Kong	CLP Group	SEHK: 2	Energy
Australia	Commonwealth Bank	ASX: CBA	Banking
United States	DuPont	NYSE: DD	Chemicals
France	Engie	Euronext Paris: ENGI	Energy
United States	ExxonMobil	NYSE: XOM	Energy
Japan	FANUC	TYO: 6954	Electronics
United States	General Electric	NYSE: GE	Conglomerate
United Kingdom	HSBC	LSE: HSBA	Banking
Spain	Inditex	BMAD: ITX	Clothing
United States	Johnson & Johnson	NYSE: JNJ	Pharmaceutical
Switzerland	Nestlé	SIX: NESN	Food & Beverage
Switzerland	Novartis	SIX: NOVN	Pharmaceutical
Japan	NTT Docomo	TYO: 9437	Telecommunications
United States	Procter & Gamble	NYSE: PG	Consumer Goods
United Kingdom	Rio Tinto	LSE: RIO	Mining
Germany	SAP	FWB: SAP	Software
United Kingdom	Shell	LSE: RDSA	Energy
Germany	Siemens	FWB: SIE	Conglomerate
United States	Southern Company	NYSE: SO	Energy
Japan	Takeda Pharmaceutical Company	TYO: 4502	Pharmaceutical
Japan	Toyota	TYO: 7203	Automotive
United Kingdom	Vodafone	LSE: VOD	Telecommunications
Australia	Wesfarmers	ASX: WES	Conglomerate
Australia	Woodside Energy	ASX: WPL	Energy
United States	Walmart	NYSE: WMT	Retail

== See also ==
- S&P Global 100
- Dow Jones Global Titans 50
