= S&P Global 1200 =

Global stock market index

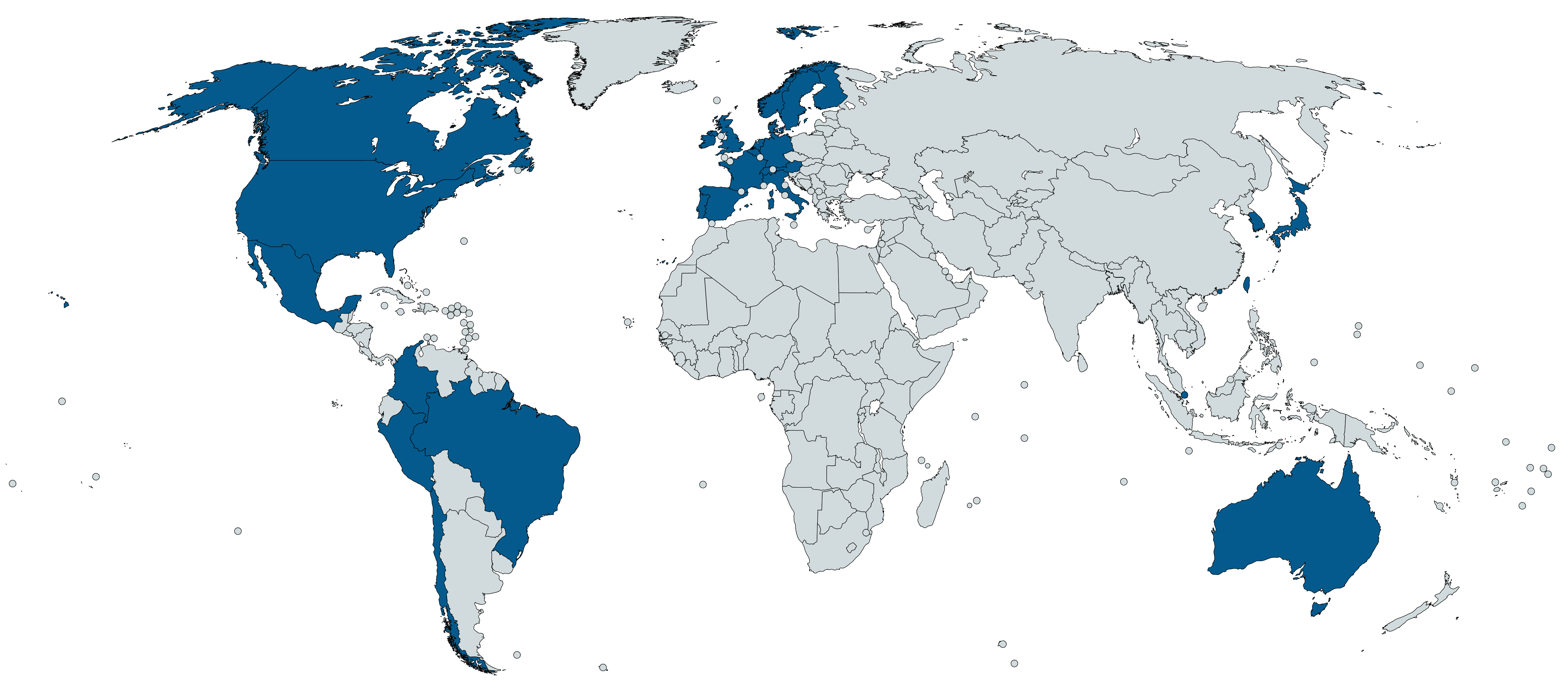
Map of all countries in the S&P 1200 as of Jan 21, 2019

The S&P Global 1200 Index is a free-float weighted stock market index of global equities from Standard & Poor's. The index was launched on Sep 30, 1999 and covers 31 countries and approximately 70 percent of global stock market capitalization. It is composed of seven regional indices:

- S&P 500 Index (United States)
- S&P Asia 50 Index (Hong Kong, Singapore, South Korea and Taiwan)
- S&P/ASX 50 Index (Australia)
- S&P Europe 350 Index (the European index is divided into three subindices: the S&P Euro, covering the eurozone markets; the S&P Euro Plus, adding Denmark, Norway, Sweden and Switzerland; and the S&P United Kingdom)
- S&P Latin America 40 Index (Brazil, Chile, Colombia, Mexico and Peru)
- S&P/TOPIX 150 Index (Japan)
- S&P/TSX 60 Index (Canada)

The Global 1200 includes companies in all eleven sectors of the Global Industry Classification Standard (GICS); the breakdown by weight is shown below.

== Subsets ==
The S&P Global 100 is a subset of multinationals from the S&P Global 1200. S&P also has the "S&P International 700", which is the S&P Global 1200 minus the S&P 500.

== Sector representation ==
Sector weights by GICS sector, as of September 30, 2026
1. Information Technology (34.3%)
2. Financials (15.6%)
3. Industrials (10.0%)
4. Health Care (8.50%)
5. Consumer Discretionary (8.30%)
6. Communication Services (8.20%)
7. Consumer Staples (4.60%)
8. Energy (3.80%)
9. Materials (3.20%)
10. Utilities (2.10%)
11. Real Estate (1.40%)

As of September 30, 2026, information technology was the largest sector in the index by weight, at 34.3 percent, followed by financials at 15.6 percent and industrials at 10.0 percent. Real estate was the smallest, at 1.4 percent.

== See also ==
- FTSE Global Equity Index Series
- MSCI World
