= Asociación del Sello de Productos de Comercio Justo =

Spanish non-profit organization

Asociación del Sello de Comercio Justo
- Company type: Non-profit organization
- Founded: 2005; 21 years ago
- Headquarters: Madrid, Spain
- Key people: Pablo Cabrera, Director
- Website: www.sellocomerciojusto.org

The Asociación del Sello de Productos de Comercio Justo (ASPCJ) is the Spanish member of FLO International, which unites 23 Fairtrade producer and labelling initiatives across Europe, Asia, Latin America, North America, Africa, Australia and New Zealand.

The ASPCJ was established in 2005 by the Fundación Ecología y Desarrollo, Fundación ETEA para el Desarrollo y la Cooperación, Fundación Intermon-Oxfam, Federación SETEM, IDEAS (Iniciativas de Economía Alternativa y Solidaria), Alternativa 3, Cáritas Española, CECU (Confederación de Consumidores y Usuarios) and the CECJ (Coordinadora Estatal de Comercio Justo).

The two key activities of the ASPCJ are:

- licensing the International Fairtrade Certification Mark in Spain;
- raising awareness about Fairtrade certification in an effort to boost sales of Fairtrade products;

There are currently four Fairtrade certified products available in Spain: coffee, sugar, cocoa and tea.
