= PagBank =

Financial services and digital payments company

- Type: Public
- Traded as: NYSE: PAGS; S&P Latin America 40 component
- Industry: Financial services; Mobile Payment; Point of sale
- Founded: 2006; 20 years ago
- Headquarters: São Paulo, Brazil (operational); Grand Cayman, Cayman Islands (legal domicile)
- Products: Electronic payment systems
- Revenue: ▲US$ 3.1 billion (2025)
- Net income: ▲US$ 487 million (2025)
- Owner: Universo Online (UOL)
- Website: pagbank.com.br

PagBank is a financial services and digital payments company based in São Paulo, Brazil and incorporated in the Grand Cayman, Cayman Islands. Founded in 2006, the company primarily offers payment processing software for e-commerce websites, mobile applications, point of sale terminals, and payment terminals. It has been traded as a public company on the New York Stock Exchange since January 2018 with the ticker symbol PAGS.

PagBank is part of Universo Online (UOL group), which, according to Ibope Nielsen Online, is Brazil's largest Internet portal, with more than 50 million unique visitors and 6.7 billion page views every month. In 2024, PagBank received the AAA highest level from Moody's Ratings.

== History ==
In 2006, UOL formed the PagSeguro to be the company's financial services platform. In January of the following year, UOL acquired BrPay, a Brazilian electronic payment company that was incorporated into PagSeguro 6 months later.

In November 2008, the company was elected the best website of the year in the Electronic Commerce category by Info Exame readers. Also in 2008, it received the INFO Award, held by Editora Abril, in the same category: Electronic Commerce.

By 2010, the company had more than 12 million registered users. In 2012, it partnered with Horus, an electronic payment means fraud prevention company.

In 2012, it partnered with Nokia to process payments via Near Field Communication (NFC), a technology that enables the safe data transmission by approaching two cell phones. It was the first company to implement NFC technology in Brazil.

In 2013, it launched the MINI reader, a credit and debit card reader designed to enable payments via mobile applications. In that same year, it partnered with Cartão Mais! and iPAGARE Magento.

It received the PCI-DSS (Payment Card Industry Data Security Standards) certification in 2013.

In 2015, it was recognized as the "Best Payment Method" by the Congresso Afiliados Brasil (Brazil Affiliates Congress).

In May 2023, the company officially rebranded, becoming PagBank. Technically, the company's name was already PagBank PagSeguro, which encompassed its two business lines: digital banking and acquisitions.

On June 6, 2025, PagBank announced its first dividend payment of USD 0.14 per share, with plans to distribute approximately 10% of net income as annual dividends.

In April 2026, PagBank raised R$1.07 billion in its third public offering of financial letters in order to expand its banking division.

== Operations ==
PagBank is an e-commerce company that intermediates payment between sellers and buyers by offering a billing option via email for traders who do not have a site or a well-structured e-commerce platform; it has agreements with several banking institutions so that sellers can offer buyers different payment methods. These banking institutions receive the payment and transfer it to the seller after making sure that there was no fraud in the operation. The service offers over 25 payment methods.

For purchases in which the customer neither receives the product, nor does it as agreed, a dispute (claim) can be started. PagBank mediates the dispute, in order to help the buyer to receive either the product or the money back, as well as to help the seller to have the transaction value refunded or to return it to the buyer.

In May 2016, the company launched Split Payment, a tool that acts on transactions commissioning models. The tool was released in VTEX Day, the largest multi-channel retail event in Latin America, in which PagBank was also the master sponsor.

In 2025, PagBank reported consolidated total revenues of R$20,410.5 million and net income attributable to shareholders of R$2,118.4 million.

=== Machines and readers ===
PagBank launched a credit card payment terminal for credit sales with up to 12 installments, in 2013.

In September 2014, it launched the Debit and Credit Reader MINI, a card reader designed for small businesses. At the end of that year, it launched Moderninha, a machine for card operations, which does not request a cell phone and comes with a chip and an internet data plan included.

In June 2016, PagBank launched "Moderninha Wifi" and in October of that year, it launched the "Moderninha Pro".

=== Cards ===
In August 2015, the company released a prepaid card with focus on the microentrepreneur, with a chip and under the MasterCard brand.

=== Credit offering ===
PagBank has identified credit as one of its areas for long-term expansion, with an objective of reaching a R$25 billion credit portfolio by December 2029.

In 2025, PagBank’s loan portfolio grew 33% to R$4.6 billion, supported by payroll loans, credit cards, and working capital.

== See also ==
- Universo Online
