= S&P/TOPIX 150 =

The S&P/TOPIX 150 Index is a stock market index of Japanese stocks from Standard & Poor's.

It is a part of the S&P Global 1200.

== Investing ==
This index is tracked by iShares Japan Large-Cap (ETF).

== See also ==
- Nikkei 225
- TOPIX
