= MSCI KLD 400 Social Index =

The MSCI KLD 400 Social Index was launched in 1990 and is designed to help socially conscious investors weigh social and environmental factors in their investment choices. It was founded by KLD's Amy Domini as the Domini 400 Social Index.

The MSCI KLD 400 Social Index is designed to provide exposure to the common stocks of companies that KLD determines have positive environmental, social and corporate governance (ESG) characteristics. The KLD400 consists of 400 companies drawn from the universe of the 3,000 largest U.S. public equities as measured by float-adjusted market capitalization. The index is composed approximately 90% of large-cap companies, 9% mid-cap companies chosen for sector diversification, and 1% small-cap companies with exemplary social and environmental records.

The eligible universe for the KLD400 is the 3,000 largest U.S. companies (by float-adjusted market capitalization) in the U.S. equity market. KLD selects the eligible universe index on April 15 (or closest business day) of each year.

KLD defines U.S. equity as follows:

- U.S. headquarters
- Primary market listing is the NYSE or NASDAQ
- Companies with non-U.S. incorporation for tax or regulatory purposes are evaluated on a case-by-case basis

KLD follows the rules of the FTSE AWD USA Index.

The following types of equities are not eligible for the KLD400:

- Preferred stocks
- Limited or other types of partnerships
- Royalty trusts
- Closed-end funds

In 2010, it was renamed from FTSE KLD 400 Social Index to MSCI KLD 400 Social Index.

== Sector representation ==
GICS of components of the MSCI KLD 400 by market capitalization
1. Energy (1.00%)
2. Materials (3.00%)
3. Industrials (9.00%)
4. Consumer Discretionary (8.00%)
5. Consumer Staples (6.00%)
6. Healthcare (10.0%)
7. Financials (11.0%)
8. Information Technology (39.0%)
9. Communication Services (9.00%)
10. Utilities (1.00%)
11. Real Estate (3.00%)

The GICS breakdown is shown here. The index is highly concentrated—i.e., information technology makes up over 39% of the total market capitalization.

Total return (%) for each calendar year
Year	MSCI KLD 400 Social Index
2019	31.3
2020	20.8
2021	31.3
2022	-21.7
2023	28.5
2024	22.5

== Selected constituents ==
Constituents which make up 70% of the total index weight. As can be seen, 33% of the index is made up from three companies (Nvidia, Microsoft, and Alphabet).

Selected constituents
Constituent	Sector	Weight (%)
Abbvie Inc	Health Care	1.17
Accenture plc class A	Information Technology	0.71
Adobe Inc	Information Technology	0.92
Advanced Micro Devices Inc	Information Technology	1.01
Alphabet Inc class A	Communication	4.09
Alphabet Inc class c	Communication	3.57
American Express	Financials	0.51
Amgen Inc	Health Care	0.63
Analog Devices Inc	Information Technology	0.45
Applied Material Inc	Information Technology	0.77
Blackrock Inc	Financials	0.45
Blk csh fnd treasury sl agency	Cash and/or Derivatives	0.42
Booking Holdings Inc	Consumer Discretionary	0.52
Bristol Myers Squibb	Health Care	0.33
Caterpillar Inc	Industrials	0.63
Charles Schwab Corp	Financials	0.43
Chubb Ltd	Financials	0.41
Cisco	Information Technology	0.73
CME Group Inc class A	Financials	0.28
Coca-Cola	Consumer Staples	1
Colgate-Palmolive	Consumer Staples	0.29
Danaher Corp	Health Care	0.7
Eaton Plc	Industrials	0.5
Elevance Health Inc	Health Care	0.49
Equinix REIT Inc	Real Estate	0.28
FIS (company)	Financials	0.17
Gilead Sciences Inc	Health Care	0.32
Home Depot	Consumer Discretionary	1.35
Illinois Tool Inc	Industrials	0.28
Intel Corporation	Information Technology	0.51
Intercontinental Exchange Inc	Financials	0.3
International Business Machines Co	Information Technology	0.61
Intuit Inc	Information Technology	0.65
Johnson Controls	Industrials	0.18
Kimberly-Clark	Consumer Staples	0.18
Lam Research Corp	Information Technology	0.53
Linde Plc	Materials	0.83
Lowes Companies Inc	Consumer Discretionary	0.5
Mastercard Inc class A	Financials	1.45
McDonald's Corp	Consumer Discretionary	0.72
Merck & Co Inc	Health Care	1.29
Microsoft Corp	Information Technology	12.25
Morgan Stanley	Financials	0.46
Nike Inc class B	Consumer Discretionary	0.44
Nvidia Corp	Information Technology	12.93
Oracle Corp	Information Technology	0.89
Pepsico Inc	Consumer Staples	0.88
Phillips 66	Energy	0.23
Procter & Gamble	Consumer Staples	1.54
Progressive Corp	Financials	0.47
Prologis REIT Inc	Real Estate	0.41
Quanta Services	Industrials	0.16
Roper Technologies	Information Technology	0.23
S&P Global Inc	Financials	0.55
Salesforce Inc	Information Technology	0.88
Sempra	Utilities	0.19
Servicenow Inc	Information Technology	0.59
Sherwin Williams	Materials	0.28
Tesla Inc	Consumer Discretionary	2
Texas Instruments	Information Technology	0.69
Trane Technologies plc	Industrials	0.29
Union Pacific Corporation	Industrials	0.53
Verizon Communications Inc	Communication	0.65
Vertex Pharmaceuticals Inc	Health Care	0.49
Visa Inc class A	Financials	1.68
Walt Disney	Communication	0.72
Xerox	Information Technology	0.01
Zoetis Inc class a	Health Care	0.31

== See also ==
- Calvert Social Index
- FTSE4Good Index
- Russell 3000 Index
