= Shariq Nisar =

Indian economist

Dr. Shariq Nisar
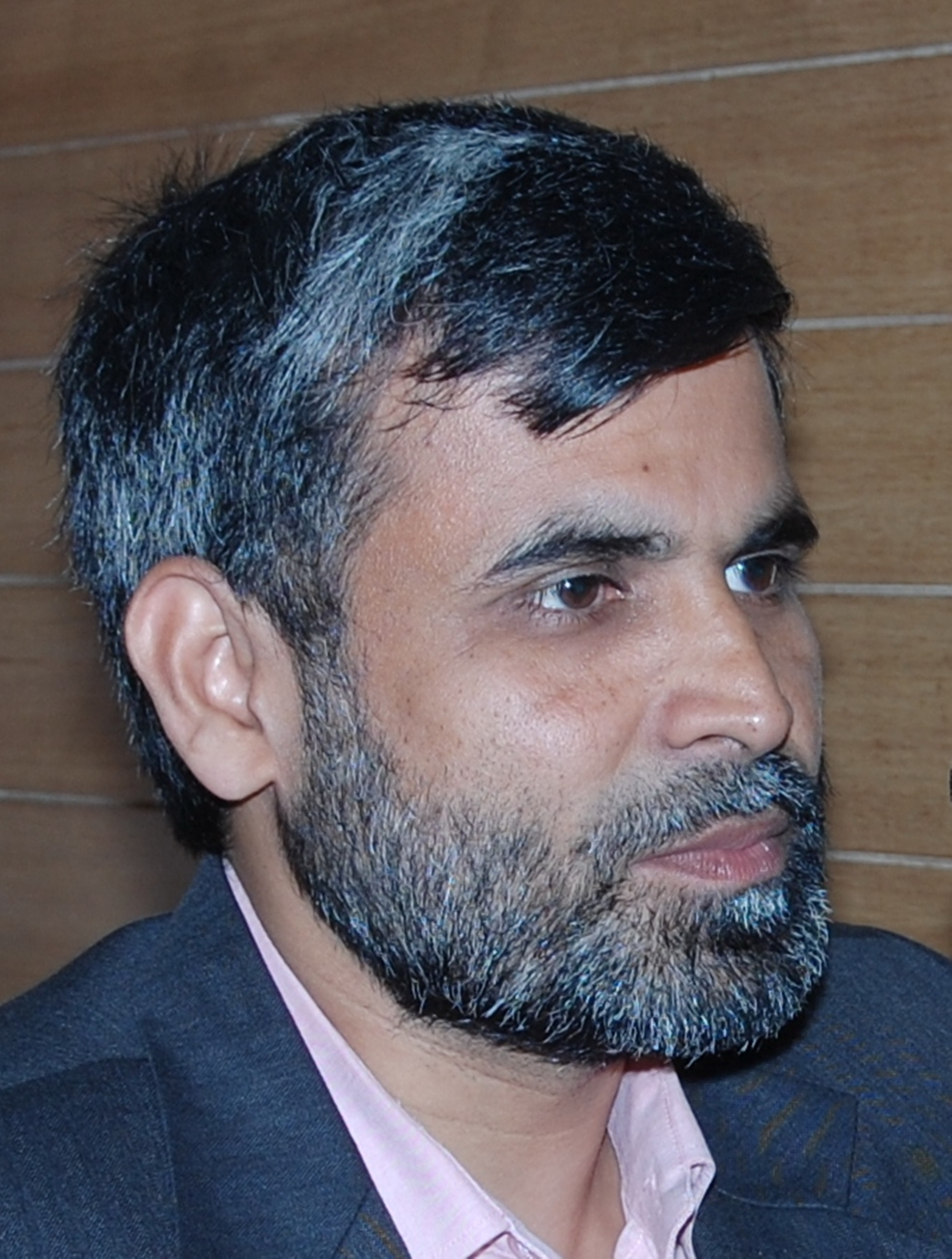
- Shariq Nisar in 2010
- Born: 9 November 1974 (age 51); Azamgarh, U.P, India
- Education: PhD (Economics), Aligarh Muslim University, Aligarh, U.P
- Occupations: Teaching, Research and Consulting
- Spouse: Dr. Rabia Khan

Shariq Nisar is an Indian finance professional, academic and activist. He has made an impact on Islamic Finance in India with his work and has been in roles both in academia, in the financial markets, and in industry.

== Education ==
He received a PhD in economics from Aligarh Muslim University, one of the oldest universities in India.

== Career ==
He co-founded TASIS (Taqwaa Advisory and Shariah Investment Solutions), a shariah advisory institution, related to finance, based in Mumbai, that screens stocks for Shariah compliance. His first major work was the launch of India's first Shariah Index in association with the Bombay Stock Exchange (i.e. "BSE TASIS Shariah 50").

Later on he worked with the National Stock Exchange to launch Shariah index for them. He is advisor to Kerala Government's Islamic Finance venture Cheraman Financial Services Ltd. He also helped Government of India owned General Insurance Corporation of India (GIC Re) establish its Retakaful division in 2009.

During 2013 and 2014, he served as a senior visiting fellow at Harvard Law School. He was invited to share his views before the Select Committee of Indian Parliament on the Insurance Laws (Amendment) Bill (2015).

He served as a non-executive independent director at Octaware Technologies from November, 2015 to December 2018, India's first shariah compliant publicly listed company.

Nisar has also authored various books in the area of Islamic Finance with International as well as Indian perspectives. He has been awarded Bharat Inclusion Research Fellowship 2020. Since 2017, he teaches a course at the University of Luxembourg.

== Other work ==
Nisar has contributed to several ethical finance initiatives in the Indian capital market. In 2009, he worked with Taurus Asset Management Company to launch India’s first ethical mutual fund, the Taurus Ethical Fund, with which he continues to be associated. From 2017 to 2020, he served as a strategy advisor to Tata Mutual Fund for their Tata Ethical Fund, focusing on outreach to grassroots investors. More recently, in December 2024, he became associated with India’s third ethical fund, launched by Quantum Asset Management Company.

Nisar is also a member of the Ethics Committee at Mount Judi Ventures, a SEBI-approved venture capital fund. He is part of the governance team of Valuable, a SEBI-approved venture debt fund focused on inclusion and the Sustainable Development Goals. He also serves on the advisory board of AssetMine.

Additionally, Dr. Nisar advises Asia Index Private Ltd., a subsidiary of the Bombay Stock Exchange, where he plays a key role in developing and maintaining the BSE 500 Shariah Index. He is also a member of the Management Board at Uplift Mutuals, an NGO working on mutual insurance for marginalized communities.

== Selected bibliography ==
=== Books ===
1. Nisar, Shariq and Ali, S.N. (2016) Takaful and Islamic Cooperative Finance: Challenges and Opportunities, Edward Elgar, the UK. (ISBN 978 1 78536 335 1).
2. Nisar, Shariq and Ali, S.N. (2014) Islamic Finance and Development, Harvard Law School, Cambridge, Massachusetts, the US, (ISBN 097028358X).
3. Nisar, Shariq, (2013) Islamic Banking, Finance and Capital Market, Textbook used by the BSE Institute for its online Islamic Finance Certification Program.

=== Book chapters ===
1. Nisar, Shariq and Farooq, Umar. (2021). "Structural Mechanisms for Islamic Ethical Wealth for SDGs", In Masum Billa (Ed.) Islamic Wealth and the SDGs – Global Strategies for Socio-Economic Impact, Palgrave Macmillan, Switzerland, ISBN 978-3-030-65312-5
2. Nisar, Shariq and Farooq, Umar. (2020) "Shari‘Ah Governance Practices in India", The Edinburgh Companion to Shari’ah Governance in Islamic Finance, Edinburgh University Press, the UK, (ISBN 978-1474436007).
3. Nisar, Shariq and Farooq, Umar. (2019) "Financial Intermediation, Fintech and Shariah Compliance", Fintech in Islamic Finance: Theory and Practice, Routledge, London, the UK, (ISBN 978-1-138-49479-4).
4. Nisar, Shariq and Rahman, Syed Mizanur. (2012) "Minority funds in India: institutional mobilization of micro savings", In Shari‘a-compliant Microfinance, Routledge, London, the UK. ISBN 041578266X
5. Nisar, Shariq and Khatkhatay, M.H. (2008) "Investments in Stocks: A Critical Review of Dow Jones Shariah Screening Norms", Islamic Capital Market: Products, Regulations and Development, IRTI/Islamic Development Bank, Jeddah, KSA, (ISBN 978-9960-32-179-0).

=== Research papers/articles ===
1. Nisar, Shariq. Agarwal, Payal and Shailabh, Kumar (2021), Insuring Bharat: Scaling up People Led Risk Protection – A Study on Mutual and cooperative insurers in India, Bharat Inclusion Initiative (BII), IIM-Ahmedabad.
2. Nisar, Shariq. (2020), "Review Essay: Encyclopaedia of Islamic Insurance, Takaful and Retakaful", Islamic Studies, Islamabad, Vol 59, No 4 p. 543-560, ISBN 978-178811-5827.
3. Nisar, Shariq. (2018) Islamic Bonds (Sukuk) and Its Application, Wealth: International Journal of Money, Banking and Finance, Vol. 7, Issue 2.
4. Nisar, Shariq (et al.). (2017) ICMIF Country Diagnostic on Mutual and Cooperative Microinsurance in India, jointly published by ICMIF and Insurance Institute of India.
5. Nisar, Shariq and Ali, S Nazim. (2016) "The Significance of Faith-based Ethical Principles in Responding to the Recurring Financial Crises" Journal of Islamic Banking and Finance, October – December.
6. Nisar, Shariq and Wasiullah, SM. (2016) "Performance of Sharia Compliant Equities: A Case Study of India" Global Islamic Finance Report, the UK.
7. Nisar, Shariq and Mohammad Shaqil. (2015) "The state of the Indian asset management landscape serving Shariah sensitive customers: Opportunity size and challenges" Thomson Reuters Global Islamic Asset Management: Outlook.
8. Nisar, Shariq. (2015) "Shrinking Space for Islamic Finance in India", Economic and Political Weekly, Vol. – L No. 17, 25 April, Mumbai, India.
9. Nisar, Shariq and Khatkhatay, MH. (2014) "Conceptual Understanding of Service Charges on Loans and Its Application in Islamic Microfinance", Sahulat: A Journal of Interest Free Microfinance, (ISSN 2319-2941) Vol. 1, No. 3, New Delhi, India.
10. Nisar, Shariq. (2012) "Shariah Finance: Gaining Foothold in India" Forum Views, Volume 1, Issue 8, Mumbai, India.
11. Nisar, Shariq. (2012) "Tapping Takaful", Cover Story Asia Insurance Post, Volume 12 Issue 8.
12. Nisar, Shariq. (2011) "Islamic Banking: A Rejoinder", Economic & Political Weekly, Mumbai, India.
13. Nisar, Shariq. (2010) "Road to Islamic Finance in India" In Global Islamic Finance Report, 2010.
14. Nisar, Shariq. (2009) "Purging of Impure Income: An Appraisal of Current Shariah Practices", In Dow Jones Islamic Market Indexes Quarterly Newsletter.
15. Nisar, Shariq. (2008) "Islamic Investment Opportunities in India" In Islamic Finance News, Kuala Lumpur, Malaysia, January.
16. Nisar, Shariq. (2008) "Islamic MFs Enter Shariah compliant product", Chartered Financial Analyst, April.
17. Nisar, Shariq. (2008) "Current Financial Crisis: Causes and Islamic Financial Solution", True Banking, Lahore, Pakistan.
18. Nisar, Shariq. (2007) "Islamic Finance in India" In Islamic Finance News, Kuala Lumpur, Malaysia, 3 August.
19. Nisar, Shariq and Khatkhatay, MH. (2007) "Shariah Compliant Equity Investments: An Assessment of Current Screening Norms", Islamic Economic Studies, Vol. 15 No. 1, Jeddah, KSA.
20. Nisar, Shariq. (2007) "Taking The Stage: Islamic Investment Opportunity in India" in Business Islamica, UAE, January.
21. Nisar, Shariq. (2007) "Islamic Finance: Looking Towards West", (Interview published in) The Sunday Indian, Issue 23, New Delhi, India, December.
22. Nisar, Shariq. (2007) "On the Crossroads of Shariah Compliance", (Co-Authored) Islamic Banking and Finance, Issue 13, the UK.
23. Nisar, Shariq. (2006) "Islamic Finance: Conventional Dilemma" In Islamic Finance Today, Colombo, December.
24. Nisar, Shariq. (2006) "Islamic Investment Opportunities in India" Islamic Finance Today, Colombo, Sri Lanka, December.
25. Nisar, Shariq. (2006) "The Practices of Islamic Banking and Finance”, Islamic Business & Finance, Dubai, November.
26. Nisar, Shariq. (2006) "The Future of Islamic Finance & Economics", Islamic Finance Today, Issue 01, Sri Lanka, September.
27. Nisar, Shariq. (2006) "India a Land of Islamic Investments Opportunities", Islamic Business & Finance, Dubai, UAE, January.
28. Nisar, Shariq. (2005) "Challenges for Islamic Banks in India", Islamic Business and Finance, Dubai, December.
29. Nisar, Shariq. (2005) "Islamic Banking: Potential for Growth", Chartered Financial Analyst, Hyderabad, India, December.
30. Nisar, Shariq. (2005) "Islamic Banking in India: Need of the Hour", Islamic Business and Finance, Dubai, November.
31. Nisar, Shariq and Khan, Javed Ahmed. (2004) "Collateral (Al-Rahn) as Practiced by Muslim Funds of North India", In Journal of King Abdul Aziz University: Islamic Economics, King Abdul Aziz University, Jeddah, Kingdom of Saudi Arabia, Vol. 17, No. 1.
32. Nisar, Shariq. (2004) "Contemporary Issues Facing Islamic Banking", In Journal of West Asian Studies, Aligarh Muslim University, ISSN Number: 0975-7864, Aligarh, India.
33. Nisar, Shariq. (2002) "The State of Islamic Finance in India: Strengths and Weaknesses", Review of Islamic Economics, Leicester, the UK.
