= Dow Jones Global Indexes =

Grouping of international equity indexes

- Abbreviation: DJGI
- Founder: Dow Jones Indexes (unit of Dow Jones & Company)
- Type: Family of international equity indexes
- Headquarters: New York City, United States
- Region served: Worldwide
- Products: World, region, and country indexes; Sector, industry-group, and subgroup indexes
- Website: S&P Dow Jones Indices

The Dow Jones Global Indexes (DJGI) is a family of international equity indexes, including world, region, and country indexes and economic sector, market sector, industry-group, and subgroup indexes created by Dow Jones Indexes, a unit of Dow Jones & Company, best known for the Dow Jones Industrial Average.

The indexes are constructed and weighted using capitalization weighting. They provide 95 percent market capitalization coverage of developed markets and emerging markets. More than 3000 DJGI indexes provide data on more than 5500 companies around the world. Market capitalization is float-adjusted.

== Indices ==
Indexes for the United States, Canada, Japan, Hong Kong, Singapore, and Australia/New Zealand are constructed to cover 95 percent of market capitalization at the country level. A single European index covers an aggregate of all Western European nations, also representing 95 percent of the aggregate market. An Emerging Markets Index represents 10 countries in Latin America and Asia. Each of these three groups offers large-cap, mid-cap, and small-cap indexes. Dow Jones Style Indexes are built as subsets of the Dow Jones U.S. Total Market Index. The DJGI family includes indexes for 10 economic industries, 19 supersectors, 41 sectors, and 114 subsectors. The indexes are reviewed quarterly.

Indices include:

- Dow Jones Industrial Average
- Dow Jones Composite Average
- Dow Jones Global Titans 50
- Dow Jones Transportation Average
- Dow Jones Utility Average
- Dow Jones Global ex-U.S. Index
- Dow Jones Developed Markets Index
- Dow Jones Emerging Markets Index
- Dow Jones Americas Index
- Dow Jones Latin America Index
- Dow Jones Asia/Pacific Index
- Dow Jones Middle East & Africa Index
