= Octaware Technologies =

Business software company in India

Octaware Technologies is a software development company based in Mumbai, India. It was incorporated in 2005. It is India's first company claiming sharia compliance that has been listed on the Bombay Stock Exchange, the listing happened on 3 April 2017. It received approval for listing in early 2016. The company operates domestically and internationally with subsidiaries registered in United Arab Emirates, United States, and India. It has marketing offices in Zimbabwe, Nigeria, Saudi Arabia and Qatar.

== Profile and products ==
The company is SEI-CMMI Level 3, ISO 9001:2008 and rated “SE-2A” High Performance Capability and High Financial Strength by NSIC-CRISIL. Octaware is a member of the Electronics and Software Promotion Council.

Octaware provides specialized software application and product development services in the areas of healthcare, finance, and e-government industry. The company has proprietary products for domestic as well as international markets, such as PowerERM – Human Capital Relationship Management, Hospice – Healthcare and Citizen services, and iOnAsset – Inventory management and tracking System etc. These products are available as packaged products as well as software-as-a-service model integrated with legacy system.

== People ==
Aslam Khan is Chairman and CEO of the company. Aslam Khan is a member of NASSCOM Foundation's Business Responsibility Forum. He is an alumnus of M. H. Saboo Siddik College of Engineering, and worked in Japan and the US before his return to India in 2005. Shariq Nisar, academic, activist and finance professional is a non-executive independent director.

== CSR initiatives ==
Octaware Technologies has designed material for a training programme at the National Association for the Blind's Employment and Training (NABET) centre, which enables NABET personnel to train those with sight impairment in software testing; it has also provided trainee opportunities to work on professional assignments. CEO Khan is the founder of a school for children with special needs and a multi-speciality hospital in Mumbai. These are based on the social entrepreneurship model. Khan has been invited to speak with students so as to acquaint them with the opportunities available in the software industry in terms of employment and entrepreneurship.
