= S&P Global 100 =

Stock market index

- Foundation: February 7, 2000; 26 years ago
- Operator: S&P Dow Jones Indices
- Trading symbol: OOI; ^SPG100; SPG100
- Constituents: 102 (as of 29 May 2026)
- Market cap: US$43.5 trillion (as of 29 May 2026)
- Weighting method: Free-float capitalization-weighted
- Related indices: S&P Global 1200
- Website: Official website
- ISIN: US78518N1000
- Reuters: .SPGBL
- Bloomberg: OOI

The S&P Global 100 Index is a stock market index of global stocks maintained by S&P Dow Jones Indices. The index measures the performance of 100 multinational, blue-chip companies of major importance in the global equity markets. It was launched in 2007, and includes 100 large-cap companies from the S&P Global 1200 whose businesses are global in nature and that derive a substantial portion of their operating income from multiple countries.

The index helps investors in tracking the performance of major global companies. With 100 highly liquid constituents, it is designed to support low-cost, index investment products, including exchange-traded funds and listed derivatives such as futures contracts and options. The companies are selected from 29 local markets, and are weighted in the index by their market capitalization.

== Methodology ==
A constituent companies are selected by an Index Committee, on the basis of global exposure, sector representation, liquidity, and size. Only companies with a minimum of US$ 5 billion in Float-Adjusted Market capitalization (FMC); with over 30% of revenues generated in foreign markets, and 30% of assets located outside the company's country of domicile are included. The Index is rebalanced on a quarterly basis, calculated in real-time in USD.

== Constituents ==
As of June 2026, the top 10 constituents of the Index are;

- Nvidia Corp
- Apple Inc.
- Microsoft Corp
- Amazon
- Alphabet Inc A
- Broadcom Inc
- Alphabet Inc C
- Samsung Electronics Co
- Eli Lily & Co
- JPMorgan Chase & Co

The highest number of companies in the Index is from the United States (51), followed by the United Kingdom (12). Firms from the United States have the highest weightage in the Index at 79.4%, the weight of top 10 constituents is 57.6%. Information technology companies have the highest index weight at 45.1%, followed by communication services at 10.7%, and finance at 10%.

== Investments ==
BlackRock iShares issues an index ETF (NYSE Arca: IOO) which tracks the S&P Global 100 index.

== See also ==
- World Water Index
- Dow Jones Global Titans 50
- BBC Global 30
- S&P 100
- S&P Global 1200
