= Price return =

Rate of return on an investment portfolio

The price return is the rate of return on an investment portfolio, where the return measure takes into account only the capital appreciation of the portfolio, while the income generated by the assets in the portfolio, in the form of interest and dividends, is ignored. This contrasts with the total return, which does take into account the income generated in the portfolio. The price return allows a clearer view as to the value growth of underlying assets composing the portfolio.

Often, when the return of a stock market index is quoted in the press, the quoted returns concern price returns, rather than the total returns. Examples are the S&P 500 and the MSCI EAFE, which are typically quoted in terms of price return. However, this can sometimes mislead when in the context of investment value, as what matters is the total return on investment. In this context, whether that return is generated in the form of cash income or in capital appreciation is irrelevant.

For the same reason, it is inappropriate to evaluate the skill of a portfolio manager by comparing the total return on the portfolio to the price return of an index. After all, the total return on the index will always exceed the price return on the same index, so the portfolio manager could simply outperform the price return of the index by investing in the index. Even so, the use of price indices is still quite common in the investment industry. For example, mutual fund investors chase the price return, and forgo valuable investment opportunities.

== See also ==
- Dividend
- Interest
- Investment performance
- Returns (economics)
