= FTSE4Good Index =

Series of stock market indices

The FTSE4Good Index Series is a series of ethical investment stock market indices launched in 2001 by the FTSE Group which reports on the performance of companies which demonstrate "strong Environmental, Social and Governance practices". A number of stock market indices are available, for example covering UK shares, US shares, European markets and Japan, with inclusion based on a range of corporate social responsibility criteria. Research for the indices is supported by the Ethical Investment Research Services (EIRIS). The index excludes companies due to their involvement in tobacco production, weapons, or coal power industry and rates companies for inclusion based environmental sustainability, relationships with stakeholders, attitudes to human rights, supply chain labour standards and the countering of bribery.

The index series is published by FTSE Russell.

According to an event study reported in 2007, it was uncertain whether inclusion in or exclusion from the index effectively incentivised the affected companies to change their behaviour in regards to social responsibility. Curran and Moran, who undertook the study, found that the movements in share prices which followed FTSE4Good announcements were not significant in a statistical sense. As to the financial performance for investors, there is no evidence that a portfolio that is subject to ethical criteria performs significantly differently compared to their unrestricted equivalent.

== FTSE4Good All-World Index ==
1. Technology (33.0%)
2. Telecommunications (3.00%)
3. Health care (11.0%)
4. Financials (16.0%)
5. Real estate (1.00%)
6. Consumer discretionary (8.00%)
7. Consumer staples (6.00%)
8. Industrials (12.0%)
9. Basic materials (4.00%)
10. Energy (4.00%)
11. Utilities (2.00%)

The FTSE4Good All-World Index contains 1713 companies, representing 47 countries. Compared to the FTSE All-World index, Pakistan and Iceland are the only countries no longer represented. Japan is the country with the biggest gain in weighting, the USA is the country with the biggest loss in weighting.

The ICB breakdown is shown here- compared to the FTSE All-World index, technology is overrepresented by 7% and consumer discretionary is underrepresented by 6%, with all other sectors being within ±1.5%. Consumer staples (the sector normally containing alcohol and tobacco), as well as industrial goods and services (containing defence) and energy (containing oil, gas and coal) all have therefore the same weighting as the broader index.

Total return (%) for each calendar year
Year	FTSE4Good All-World Index
2019	29.1
2020	14.6
2021	22.6
2022	-16.5
2023	24
2024	17.6

== Top 10 constituents by index weight ==
Constituent	Weight (%)
Microsoft Corp	6.61
Apple Inc.	5.66
NVIDIA	4.68
Alphabet Inc A	2.21
Alphabet Inc C	1.88
Eli Lilly and Company	1.51
Taiwan Semiconductor Manufacturing	1.33
Visa Inc.	0.98
Novo Nordisk B	0.91
Procter & Gamble	0.88

== See also ==
- Dow Jones Sustainability Indices
- MSCI KLD 400 Social Index
