= S&P 500 =

Large-cap American stock market index

- Foundation: March 4, 1957; 69 years ago
- Operator: S&P Dow Jones Indices
- Exchanges: NYSE; Nasdaq; Cboe BZX Exchange
- Trading symbol: ^GSPC; $SPX; SPX; .SPX; .INX
- Constituents: 503
- Type: Large-cap
- Market cap: US$68.4 trillion (as of Sep 30, 2026)
- Weighting method: Free-float capitalization-weighted
- Related indices: S&P 1500; S&P Global 1200; S&P 100
- Website: www.spglobal.com/spdji/en/indices/equity/sp-500/

Industry classification of the components of the index per the Global Industry Classification Standard as of August 12, 2026
1. Information Technology (37.4%)
2. Financials (12.2%)
3. Communication Services (9.67%)
4. Consumer Discretionary (9.34%)
5. Health Care (9.09%)
6. Industrials (8.68%)
7. Consumer Staples (4.49%)
8. Energy (3.27%)
9. Utilities (2.01%)
10. Materials (1.82%)
11. Real Estate (1.79%)

The S&P 500 (Standard and Poor's 500) is a stock market index tracking the stock performance of 500 companies listed on stock exchanges in the United States that are considered to have large market capitalizations. The S&P 500 is a subset of the S&P 1500. It is maintained by S&P Dow Jones Indices and its components are selected by a committee. For a list of the criteria for addition to the index, see S&P 1500 § Selection criteria.

The index is a public-float-weighted/capitalization-weighted index. The index includes approximately 83% of the total market capitalization of U.S. public companies, with an aggregate market capitalization of more than $61.1 trillion as of December 31, 2025. The median market capitalization of the components of the index is $41.8 billion and components range in market capitalization from $5.6 billion to $4.8 trillion.

Products linked to the S&P 500 include index funds (exchange-traded funds/ETFs and mutual funds) as well as derivatives (options and futures contracts), which are available for trading in many countries with the goal of replicating the performance of the index. Also available are modified index funds; they replicate the performance of the index with modifications such as the use of covered call strategies, equal weighting, performance buffers, leverage, inclusion of only growth or value stocks, or exclusion of certain sectors, all with the goal of changing the risk/return and yield. The SPDR S&P 500 ETF Trust, with approximately $800 billion in assets, has the highest average daily volume of all S&P 500 ETFs. In total, there was approximately $13 trillion in assets tracking the index as of December 31, 2024.

The component companies that have increased their dividends for at least 25 consecutive years are known as the S&P 500 Dividend Aristocrats. Companies in the S&P 500 derive a collective 72% of revenues from the United States and 28% from other countries. The index is one of the factors in the computation of the Conference Board Leading Economic Index, which is used to forecast the direction of the economy. The index is associated with many ticker symbols, including ^GSPC, .INX, and SPX, depending on market or website.

== History ==
Though there is large variability in month-to-month changes in the S&P 500 (gray lines), a seasonal pattern emerges when the monthly change values are averaged (bold line).

In 1860, Henry Varnum Poor published the History of Railroads and Canals in the United States, a reference guide to the railroad industry for investors; in 1868 he published the book's follow-up, Poor's Manual of the Railroads of the United States. In 1923, Standard Statistics Company (founded in 1906 as the Standard Statistics Bureau) began rating mortgage bonds and developed its first stock market index consisting of the stocks of 233 U.S. companies, computed weekly. Three years later, it developed a 90-stock index, computed daily. In 1941, Poor's publishing company merged with Standard Statistics Company to form Standard & Poor's.

On Monday, March 4, 1957, the index was expanded to its current extent of 500 companies and was renamed the S&P 500 Stock Composite Index. In 1962, Ultronic Systems became the compiler of the S&P indices including the S&P 500 Stock Composite Index, the 425 Stock Industrial Index, the 50 Stock Utility Index, and the 25 Stock Rail Index. On August 31, 1976, The Vanguard Group offered the first mutual fund to retail investors that tracked the index. On April 21, 1982, the Chicago Mercantile Exchange began trading futures based on the index. On July 1, 1983, the Chicago Board Options Exchange began trading options based on the index. Beginning in 1986, the index value was updated every 15 seconds, or 1,559 times per trading day, with price updates disseminated by Reuters. Prior to this, it had been updated once every minute.

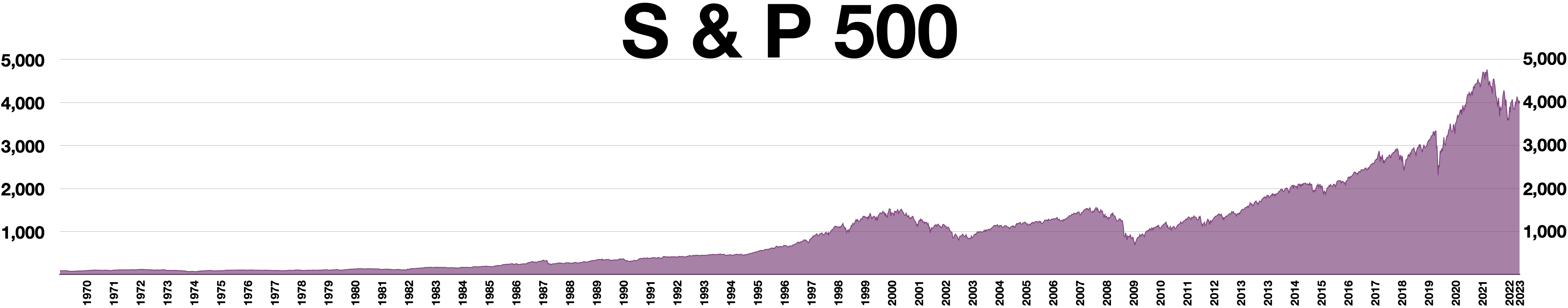
S&P 500 from 1970 to 2023

On January 22, 1993, the Standard & Poor's Depositary Receipts exchange-traded fund issued by State Street Corporation began trading. On September 9, 1997, CME Group introduced the S&P E-mini futures contract. In 2005, the index transitioned to a public float-adjusted capitalization-weighting. Friday, September 17, 2021, was the final trading date for the original SP big contract which began trading in 1982.

== Subsets ==
S&P Dow Jones Indices provides several indices which are primarily market cap-based subsets of the S&P 500, all categorized within the megacap segment:

- S&P 100
- S&P 500 Top 50
- S&P 500 Top 20
- S&P 500 Top 10

The constituents of the S&P 100 are chosen by an index committee, typically from among "the largest companies in the S&P 500 that have listed options" while also considering sector balance. By contrast, the "Top" indices are entirely rules-based, basically taking the specified number of very largest (by float-adjusted market capitalization) companies from the S&P 500, though each index has some level of buffering to favor retaining current constituents. The S&P 500 Top 50 Index is comparable to the Russell Top 50 Mega Cap Index. The S&P 500 Top 20 and Top 10 indexes are comparable to the Russell Top 20 and Top 10 indexes.

S&P DJI also offers a nominally-related "S&P 500 Magnificent 7 Index".

As of 2026, the S&P 500 is fairly top-heavy, with the S&P 500 Top 20 comprising nearly half of the index's total market cap:

Total market caps vs. S&P 500, as of August 31, 2026
Index	Total market cap (US$ millions)
S&P 500	68,828,211.97(100%)
S&P 100	49,994,155.94(72.6%)
S&P 500 Top 50	43,265,667.23(62.9%)
S&P 500 Top 20	33,755,787.57(49.0%)
S&P 500 Top 10	26,766,343.29(38.9%)

== Performance ==
Since its inception in 1926, the index's compound annual growth rate—including dividends—has been approximately 9.8% (6% after inflation), with the standard deviation of the return, calculated on a monthly basis, over the same time period being 20.81%. While the index has declined in several years by over 30%, it has posted annual increases 70% of the time, with 5% of all trading days resulting in record highs.

Show / Hide table
Year	Price return (excluding dividends)	Total return (including dividends)	Annualized Return over				
Year	Price return (excluding dividends)	Total return (including dividends)	5 years	10 years	15 years	20 years	25 years
1961	23.13%	-	-	-	-	-	-
1962	−11.81%	-	-	-	-	-	-
1963	18.89%	-	-	-	-	-	-
1964	12.97%	-	-	-	-	-	-
1965	9.06%	-	-	-	-	-	-
1966	−13.09%	-	-	-	-	-	-
1967	20.09%	-	-	-	-	-	-
1968	7.66%	-	-	-	-	-	-
1969	−11.36%	-	-	-	-	-	-
1970	0.10%	4.01%	-	-	-	-	-
1971	10.79%	14.31%	-	-	-	-	-
1972	15.63%	18.98%	-	-	-	-	-
1973	−17.37%	−14.66%	-	-	-	-	-
1974	−29.72%	−26.47%	−2.35%	-	-	-	-
1975	31.55%	37.20%	3.21%	-	-	-	-
1976	19.15%	23.84%	4.87%	-	-	-	-
1977	−11.50%	−7.18%	−0.21%	-	-	-	-
1978	1.06%	6.56%	4.32%	-	-	-	-
1979	12.31%	18.44%	14.76%	5.86%	-	-	-
1980	25.77%	32.50%	13.96%	8.45%	-	-	-
1981	−9.73%	−4.92%	8.10%	6.47%	-	-	-
1982	14.76%	21.55%	14.09%	6.70%	-	-	-
1983	17.27%	22.56%	17.32%	10.63%	-	-	-
1984	1.40%	6.27%	14.81%	14.78%	8.76%	-	-
1985	26.33%	31.73%	14.67%	14.32%	10.49%	-	-
1986	14.62%	18.67%	19.87%	13.83%	10.76%	-	-
1987	2.03%	5.25%	16.47%	15.27%	9.86%	-	-
1988	12.40%	16.61%	15.31%	16.31%	12.17%	-	-
1989	27.25%	31.69%	20.37%	17.55%	16.61%	11.55%	-
1990	−6.56%	−3.10%	13.20%	13.93%	13.94%	11.16%	-
1991	26.31%	30.47%	15.36%	17.59%	14.34%	11.90%	-
1992	4.46%	7.62%	15.88%	16.17%	15.47%	11.34%	-
1993	7.06%	10.08%	14.55%	14.93%	15.72%	12.76%	-
1994	−1.54%	1.32%	8.70%	14.38%	14.52%	14.58%	10.98%
1995	34.11%	37.58%	16.59%	14.88%	14.81%	14.60%	12.22%
1996	20.26%	22.96%	15.22%	15.29%	16.80%	14.56%	12.55%
1997	31.01%	33.36%	20.27%	18.05%	17.52%	16.65%	13.07%
1998	26.67%	28.58%	24.06%	19.21%	17.90%	17.75%	14.94%
1999	19.53%	21.04%	28.56%	18.21%	18.93%	17.88%	17.25%
2000	−10.14%	−9.10%	18.33%	17.46%	16.02%	15.68%	15.34%
2001	−13.04%	−11.89%	10.70%	12.94%	13.74%	15.24%	13.78%
2002	−23.37%	−22.10%	−0.59%	9.34%	11.48%	12.71%	12.98%
2003	26.38%	28.68%	−0.57%	11.07%	12.22%	12.98%	13.84%
2004	8.99%	10.88%	−2.30%	12.07%	10.94%	13.22%	13.54%
2005	3.00%	4.91%	0.54%	9.07%	11.52%	11.94%	12.48%
2006	13.62%	15.79%	6.19%	8.42%	10.64%	11.80%	13.37%
2007	3.53%	5.49%	12.83%	5.91%	10.49%	11.82%	12.73%
2008	−38.49%	−37.00%	−2.19%	−1.38%	6.46%	8.43%	9.77%
2009	23.45%	26.46%	0.41%	−0.95%	8.04%	8.21%	10.54%
2010	12.78%	15.06%	2.29%	1.41%	6.76%	9.14%	9.94%
2011	−0.00%	2.11%	−0.25%	2.92%	5.45%	7.81%	9.28%
2012	13.41%	16.00%	1.66%	7.10%	4.47%	8.22%	9.71%
2013	29.60%	32.39%	17.94%	7.40%	4.68%	9.22%	10.26%
2014	11.39%	13.69%	15.45%	7.67%	4.24%	9.85%	9.62%
2015	−0.73%	1.38%	12.57%	7.30%	5.00%	8.19%	9.82%
2016	9.54%	11.96%	14.66%	6.94%	6.69%	7.68%	9.15%
2017	19.42%	21.83%	15.79%	8.49%	9.92%	7.19%	9.69%
2018	−6.24%	−4.38%	8.49%	13.12%	7.77%	5.62%	9.07%
2019	28.88%	31.49%	11.70%	13.56%	9.00%	6.06%	10.22%
2020	16.26%	18.40%	15.22%	13.89%	9.88%	7.47%	9.56%
2021	26.89%	28.71%	18.48%	16.55%	10.66%	9.52%	9.76%
2022	−19.44%	−18.11%	9.43%	12.56%	8.80%	9.80%	7.64%
2023	24.23%	26.29%	15.69%	12.03%	13.97%	9.69%	7.56%
2024	23.31%	25.02%	14.53%	13.10%	13.88%	10.35%	7.70%
2025	16.39%	17.88%	14.43%	14.82%	14.07%	11.00%	8.82%
High	34.11%	37.58%	28.56%	19.21%	18.93%	17.88%	17.25%
Low	−38.49%	−37.00%	−2.35%	−1.38%	4.24%	5.62%	7.56%
Median	12.59%	15.90%	14.26%	12.94%	10.85%	11.16%	10.24%
Year	Price return (excluding dividends)	Total return (including dividends)	Annualized Return over				
Year	Price return (excluding dividends)	Total return (including dividends)	5 years	10 years	15 years	20 years	25 years

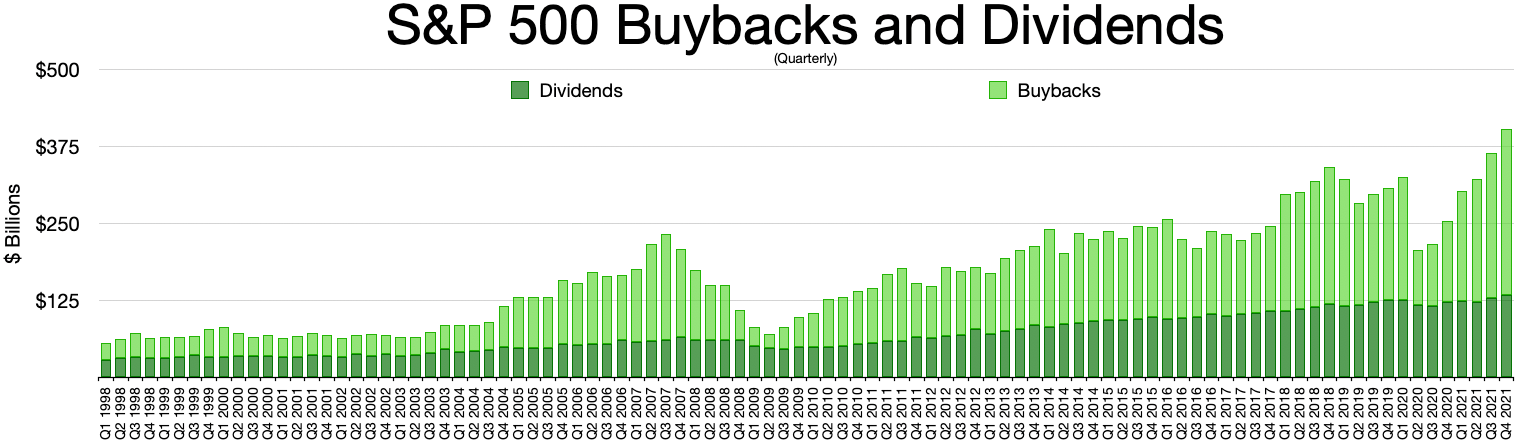
S&P 500 Buybacks and Dividends (quarterly) Stock buyback Dividends

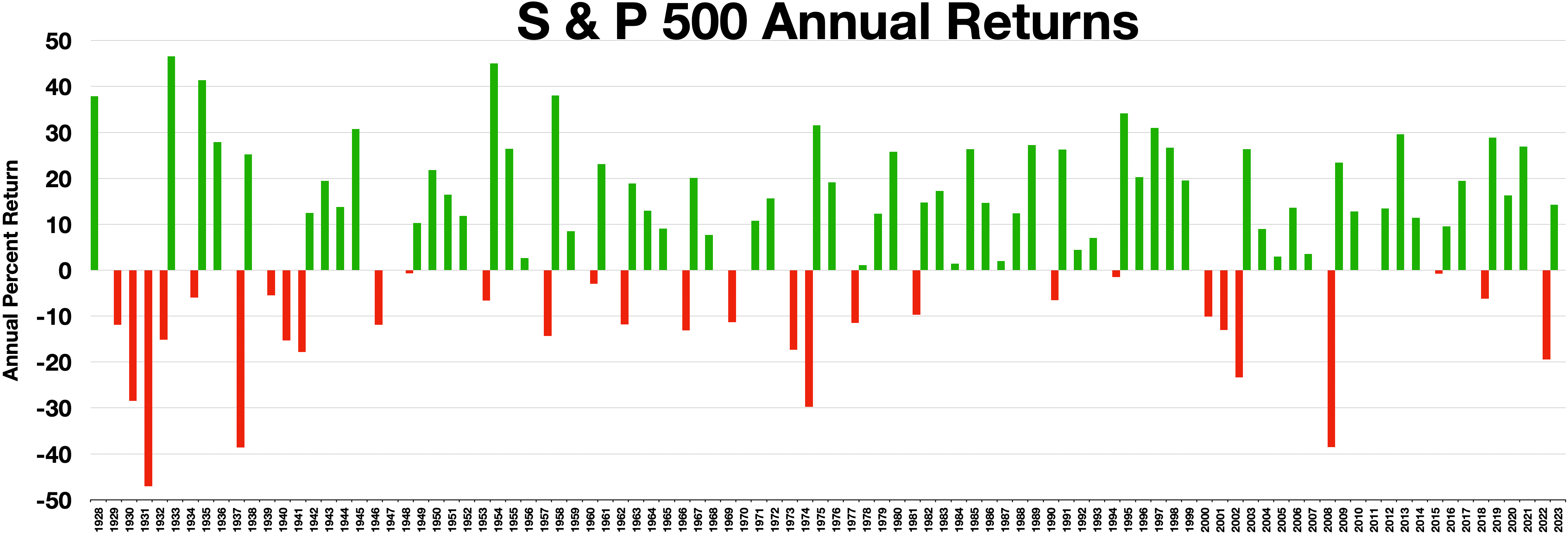
S&P 500 annual returns

== See also ==
- List of S&P 500 companies
- Historical components of the S&P 500
- Closing milestones of the S&P 500
- List of recessions in the United States
