= S&P Dow Jones Indices =

Joint venture that produces stock market indices

S&P Dow Jones Indices LLC
- Trade name: S&P Dow Jones Indices
- Type: Joint venture
- Founded: 1882; 144 years ago
- Founder: Charles Dow, Edward Jones, Charles Bergstresser
- Headquarters: 55 Water Street, New York City, United States
- Owner: S&P Global (73%); CME Group (27%)
- Website: www.spglobal.com/spdji

S&P Dow Jones Indices (S&P DJI) produces, maintains, licenses, and markets stock market indices. The company is 73% owned by S&P Global and 27% owned by CME Group.

Stock market indices maintained by the company include the S&P 500 and the Dow Jones Industrial Average (DJIA), which were created in 1957 and 1896, respectively. The company also manages the oldest index in use, the Dow Jones Transportation Index, created in 1882 by Charles Dow, the founder of The Wall Street Journal.

The company also produces market commentary videos, video interviews, and press events.

== History ==
In February 2010, CME Group agreed to purchase 90% of Dow Jones & Company's financial-indexes business, including the Dow Jones Industrial Average. CME Group and Dow Jones & Company subsequently contributed the Dow Jones Indexes to the formation of S&P Dow Jones Indices, with CME Group receiving a 24.4% ownership interest and Dow Jones & Company receiving a 2.6% ownership interest in the joint venture. In April 2013, CME Group purchased the Dow Jones & Company interest for $80 million, increasing CME Group's interest in S&P Dow Jones Indices from 24.4% to 27.0%.

In December 2020, S&P DJI removed some Chinese companies from its indices following an executive order signed by President Donald Trump which prohibited U.S. investors from purchasing or investing in securities of companies which the U.S. Department of Defense has designated as being backed by the Chinese Military.

== List of notable indices ==
- Global or regional
  - Dow Jones Global Titans 50
  - S&P Global 100 (subset of S&P Global 1200)
  - S&P Global 1200, composed of:
    - S&P Asia 50
    - S&P Europe 350
      - S&P Europe 350 Dividend Aristocrats
    - S&P Latin America 40
    - National components: S&P 500 (US), S&P/ASX 50 (Australia), S&P/TOPIX 150 (Japan), S&P/TSX 60 (Canada)
- Australia
  - All Ordinaries (broad market index)
  - S&P/ASX 300 (broad market index)
    - S&P/ASX 200
      - S&P/ASX 50 (large-cap)
        - S&P/ASX 20 (very large cap)
- S&P BSE 500 Shariah Index (India)
- S&P/NZX 50 (New Zealand)
- S&P Sri Lanka 20 Index
- S&P/TOPIX 150 (Japan)
- S&P/TSX Composite Index (Canada, broad market index)
  - S&P/TSX 60 (Canada, large-cap)
- United States
  - Dow Jones Composite Average, composed of:
    - Dow Jones Industrial Average
    - Dow Jones Transportation Average
    - Dow Jones Utility Average
  - S&P 1500 (broad market index), composed of:
    - S&P 500 (large-cap)
      - S&P 500 Dividend Aristocrats
      - S&P 100 (very large cap)
    - S&P MidCap 400
    - S&P SmallCap 600
