= Sharik ibn Hudayr al-Taghlibi =

Sharik ibn Hudayr al-Taghlibi (Arabic: شريك بن حدير التغلبي) was a companion of Ali and fought for him in Battle of Siffin. He was also very close to the Malik al-Ashtar. According to some traditions, he was killed by Husayn ibn Numayr in a fight with Ubayd Allah ibn Ziyad with al-Mukhtar al-Thaqafi.
