= FTSE Global Equity Index Series =

Stock market indices

Global map showing countries in blue tones which are part of GEIS as of July 2025. Countries are divided into developed, advanced emerging, and secondary emerging markets (from dark to lighter blue tone). Countries not in GEIS are marked in gray.

The FTSE Global Equity Index Series is a series of stock market indices provided by FTSE Group. It was launched in September 2003, and provides coverage of over 17,000 stocks in 48 countries, covering 98% of the world's investable market capitalization.

The series comprises various global and local indices, including:

- FTSE Global Total Cap Index, a global index covering approximately 17,000 stocks from micro cap to large cap
- FTSE Global All Cap Index, a global index covering approximately 10,000 stocks from small cap to large cap
- FTSE All-World Index, a global index covering approximately 4,000 mid cap and large cap stocks

Several of the indices in the series are used by The Vanguard Group as bases of their mutual funds and ETFs.

== Overview of indices ==
These are some of the most important indices managed by FTSE:

Size (market cap) of companies included	Markets included		
Size (market cap) of companies included	Global	Developed	Emerging
Large, medium, small and micro cap	FTSE Global Total Cap	FTSE Developed Total Cap	FTSE Emerging Total Cap
Large, medium and small cap	FTSE Global All Cap	FTSE Developed All Cap	FTSE Emerging All Cap
Large and medium cap	FTSE All-World	FTSE Developed World	FTSE Emerging Markets

== FTSE All-World Index ==
The All-World Index is sub-divided into three segments based on market status of included countries:

- Developed
- Advanced Emerging
- Secondary Emerging

The Base Date is 31 December, 1986.

=== History ===
This index has been calculated since 31 December 1986, originally as the FT-Actuaries World Index.

In 1995, Wood Mackenzie and Co., one of the original partners, sold its stake to Standard & Poor’s. The name of the index was changed to FT/S&P – Actuaries World Indices.

On 29 November 1999, FTSE International Limited acquired the stakes of Goldman Sachs and Standard & Poor’s. The name changed to the FTSE World Index series.

FTSE took exclusive rights to integrate the Baring Emerging Markets data series with its existing FTSE World Index series. This resulted in the creation of the FTSE All-World Index series on 30 June, 2000.

On 22 September, 2003, FTSE introduced enhancements to improve the coverage of mid cap stocks in the index and remove some smaller stocks.

=== Countries/Regions ===
Global map with all countries in blue that were part of the FTSE All-World Index as of July 2025

The FTSE All-World Index includes companies from nearly 50 countries. Due to the market capitalization weighting and as of July 2025, the US-based companies together cover more than 60% of the index weight (see pie chart).

Country breakdown of FTSE All-World Index as of July 2025. The Other category subsumes multiple countries with weights smaller than 2%.
1. USA (63.7%)
2. Japan (5.54%)
3. UK (3.38%)
4. China (3.37%)
5. Canada (2.44%)
6. France (2.34%)
7. Germany (2.19%)
8. Taiwan (2.05%)
9. Switzerland (2.04%)
10. India (2.02%)
11. Other (11.0%)

The index currently covers the following countries/regions:

- Australia
- Austria
- Belgium
- Brazil
- Canada
- Chile
- China
- Colombia
- Czech Rep.
- Denmark
- Egypt
- Finland
- France
- Germany
- Greece
- Hong Kong
- Hungary
- Iceland
- India
- Indonesia
- Ireland
- Israel
- Italy
- Japan
- Korea
- Kuwait
- Malaysia
- Mexico
- Netherlands
- New Zealand
- Norway
- Philippines
- Poland
- Portugal
- Qatar
- Romania
- Saudi Arabia
- Singapore
- South Africa
- Spain
- Sweden
- Switzerland
- Taiwan
- Thailand
- Turkey
- UAE
- UK
- USA

=== Total annual returns ===
Gross year-on-year return (%) for each calendar year (in US dollars)
Year	FTSE All-World Index	FTSE Developed Index	FTSE Emerging Index
2012	17.1	17.0	17.9
2013	23.3	26.8	-3.5
2014	4.8	5.1	1.6
2015	-1.7	-0.3	-15.2
2016	8.6	8.2	13.5
2017	24.6	23.9	32.5
2018	-9.1	-8.6	-13.0
2019	27.2	28.0	20.6
2020	16.6	16.7	15.5
2021	18.9	21.4	0.1
2022	-17.7	-17.8	-16.9
2023	22.6	24.2	9.1
2024	17.7	18.2	12.8

=== Sector representation ===
ICB Supersector Breakdown in All-World Index as of July 2025. Other category subsuming multiple supersectors with weight smaller than 3%
1. Technology (30.4%)
2. Industrial Goods and Services (11.8%)
3. Health Care (8.25%)
4. Banks (7.93%)
5. Retailers (5.79%)
6. Financial Services (4.91%)
7. Energy (3.77%)
8. Insurance (3.10%)
9. Other (24.1%)

The ICB breakdown is shown here in the pie chart, with technology being the biggest sector with about 30% formed by 428 constituents as of July 2025.

=== Top 10 Constituents by index weight ===
The top 10 constituents of the FTSE All-World Index as of July 2025 are mostly US-based big tech companies. Taken together, these 10 make up more than 20% of the total index weight.

Top 10 Constituents as of July 2025
Constituent	Weight (%)
NVIDIA	4.81
Microsoft Corp	4.58
Apple Inc.	3.45
Amazon.com Inc	2.60
Meta Platforms Inc	1.52
Broadcom Inc	1.57
Alphabet Inc A	1.29
Taiwan Semiconductor Manufacturing	1.09
Alphabet Inc C	1.06
Tesla	1.00

== See also ==
- MSCI World
- Stock market index
- Exchange-traded fund
