= Market sector =

Productivity in the market sector of the Australian system of national accounts

The term market sector is used in economics and finance to describe a part of the economy. It is usually a broader term than industry, which is a set of businesses that are buying and selling such similar goods and services that they are in direct competition with each other.

According to the national accounts terminology used by the OECD, the business sector is also known as the market sector. This designation refers to the existence of a market with recorded sales, transactions, and prices that permit the direct measurement of output. In this framework, the market sector coincides with the business sector.

== See also ==
- Economic sector
- Global Industry Classification Standard (GICS)
- Industry Classification Benchmark (ICB)
- Market segmentation
- Thomson Reuters Business Classification (TRBC)
