= Total return =

The total return on a portfolio of investments takes into account both the capital appreciation on the portfolio, and the income received on the portfolio. The income typically consists of interest, dividends, and securities lending fees. This contrasts with the price return, which takes into account only the capital gain on an investment. In 2010 an academic paper highlighted this issue found with most web charts in the 'compare' mode, and was published in the Journal of Behavioral Finance. The discrepancy between total return charts and "price only" charts was later brought out in the Wall Street Journal.

Stock and bond funds provide annual Total Return values summarizing the last ten years of operation. Total Return assumes that dividends and interest are reinvested in the funds. A reasonably accurate equation for the percent Total Return in a year of any security is the sum of the percent gain (or loss, a negative percent) over the year in the security value, plus the annual dividend yield expressed as a percent (100 × annual dividends divided by the security price at the beginning of the year). This slightly understates the total return because it ignores the reinvestment of dividends, as soon as they are paid, for purchasing more of the security. Professor Pankaj Agrrawal produced the ReturnFinder App to rectify the issue created by these web-charts, the App's algorithm includes dividends and bond income in the total return calculations. The problem can lead to the pernicious inversion of performance ordering with bond ETF's or stocks paying high dividends.

A variant measure of total return is tax-adjusted or after-tax return, which approximates the effective return that a tax-paying investor actually sees considering taxes paid on distributions.

== Measurement and reinvestment ==
Total return measures both the change in an investment's price and the income received from it, such as dividends or interest. For a stock investment, total return can be calculated by adding the change in market value to dividends received and then dividing by the original investment amount.

For investment funds, total return is commonly used because changes in net asset value alone may not reflect distributions paid to investors. Mutual funds may allow dividends and capital-gain distributions to be reinvested in additional fund shares, and comparing funds by total return can give a more complete measure of performance than comparing net asset value alone.

== See also ==
- Interest
- Investment performance
- Rate of return
- Returns (economics)
