= Stock market index =

Financial metric which investors use to determine market performance

A comparison of three major US stock indices: the Dow Jones Industrial Average, the NASDAQ Composite, and the S&P 500. All three have the same height at March 2007. The NASDAQ spiked during the dot-com bubble in the late 1990s, a result of the large number of technology companies on that index.

In finance, a stock market index or stock index is an index that measures the performance of a stock market, or of a subset of a stock market. It helps investors compare current stock price levels with past prices to calculate market performance.

Two of the primary criteria of an index are that it is investable and transparent: The methods of its construction are specified. Investors may be able to invest in a stock market index by buying an index fund, which is structured as either a mutual fund or an exchange-traded fund, and "tracks" an index. The difference between an index fund's performance and the index, if any, is called tracking error.

== Types of indices by coverage ==
Stock market indices may be classified and segmented by the set of underlying stocks included in the index, sometimes referred to as the "coverage". The underlying stocks are typically grouped together based on their underlying economics or underlying investor demand that the index is seeking to represent or track.

The coverage of a stock market index is separate from the weighting method. For example, the S&P 500 market-cap weighted index covers the 500 largest stocks from the S&P Total Market Index, but an equally weighted S&P 500 index is also available with the same coverage.

World or global coverage
These indices attempt to represent the performance of the global stock market. The MSCI World has nearly 1,400 constituents that cover approximately 85% of the free float-adjusted market capitalization in 23 developed countries. The FTSE Global Equity Index Series goes further down the market capitalization spectrum by including over 16,000 companies. By contrast, the S&P Global 100 is more limited with only 100.
Regional coverage
These indices represent the performance of the stock market of a single geographical region. Some examples of these indices are the FTSE Developed Europe Index, and the FTSE Developed Asia Pacific Index.
Country coverage
These indices represent the performance of the stock market of a single country—and by proxy, reflect investor sentiment on the state of its economy. The most frequently quoted market indices are national indices composed of the stocks of large companies listed on a nation's largest stock exchanges, such as the DAX in Germany, the NIFTY 50 in India, the Nikkei 225 in Japan, KSE 100 in Pakistan, the FTSE 100 in the United Kingdom, and the S&P 500 in the United States.
Exchange-based coverage
These indices may be based on the exchange on which the stocks are traded, such as the NASDAQ-100, or groups of exchanges, such as the Euronext 100 or OMX Nordic 40.
Sector-based coverage
These indices track the performance of specific market sectors. Some examples are the Wilshire US REIT Index, which tracks more than 80 real estate investment trusts, and the NASDAQ Biotechnology Index which consists of about 200 firms in the biotechnology industry.

== Types of indices by weighting method ==
Chart of S&P BSE SENSEX Index monthly data from August 2, 1995, to August 2, 2017. The SENSEX represents the top 30 companies by market cap.

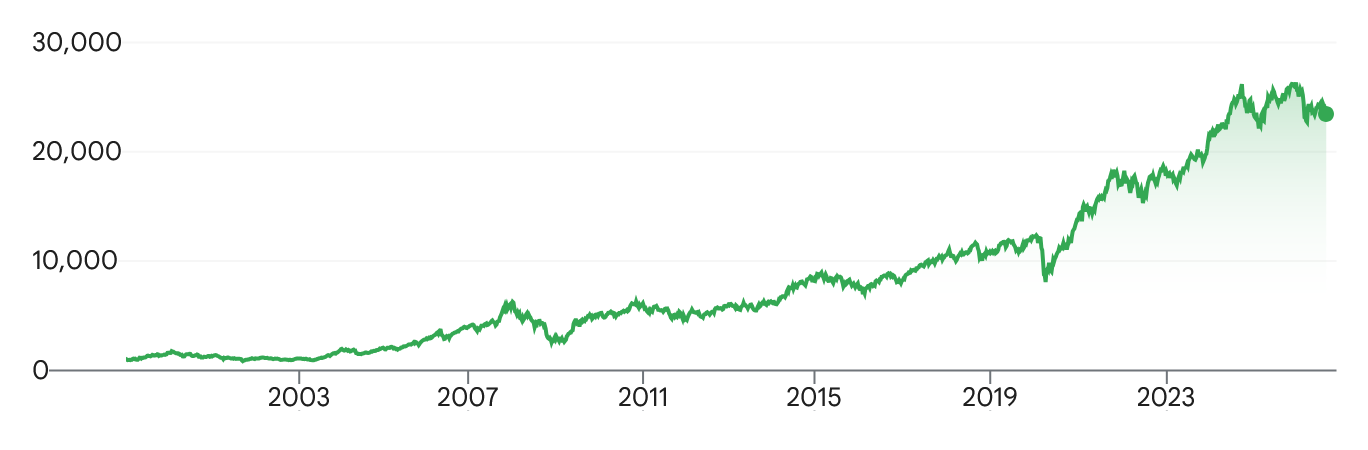
National Stock Exchange of India from 2000 to 2020. (Indices NIFTY 50). The NIFTY 50 represents the top 50 companies by market cap.

Stock market indices may be categorized by their index weight methodology, or the rules on how stocks are allocated in the index, independent of its stock coverage. For example, the S&P 500 and the S&P 500 Equal Weight each cover the same group of stocks, but the S&P 500 is weighted by market capitalization, while the S&P 500 Equal Weight places equal weight on each constituent. Some common index weighting methods are listed below. In practice, many indices will impose constraints, such as concentration limits, on these rules.

Market-capitalization weighting
This method weights constituent stocks by their market capitalization (often shortened to "market cap"), i.e. the stock price multiplied by the number of shares outstanding. Under the capital asset pricing model, a market-cap weighted market portfolio (which could be approximated by a market-cap weighted equity index portfolio) is mean-variance efficient, meaning that it can be expected to produce the highest available return for a given level of risk. A market-cap weighted index might also be thought of as a liquidity-weighted index, since the largest-cap stocks tend to have the highest liquidity and the greatest capacity to handle investor flows; portfolios with such stocks could have very high investment capacity. One argument for capitalization weighting is that investors must, in aggregate, hold a capitalization-weighted portfolio anyway. This then gives the average return for all investors; if some investors do worse, other investors must do better (excluding costs).
Free-float adjusted market-capitalization weighting
This method adjusts each company's market-cap index weight by excluding closely or strategically held shares that are not generally available to the public market. Such shares may be held by governments, affiliated companies, founders, and employees. Foreign ownership limits imposed by government regulation could also be subject to free-float adjustments. These adjustments inform investors of potential liquidity issues from these holdings that are not apparent from the raw number of a stock's shares outstanding. Free-float adjustments are not easy to calculate, and different index providers have different free-float adjustment methods, which could sometimes produce different results.
Price weighting
This method weights each constituent stock by its price per share divided by the sum of all share prices in the index. A price-weighted index can be thought of as a portfolio with one share of each constituent stock. However, a stock split for any constituent stock of the index would cause the weight in the index of the stock that split to decrease, even in the absence of any meaningful change in the fundamentals of that stock. This feature makes price-weighted indices unattractive as benchmarks for passive investment strategies and portfolio managers. Nonetheless, many price-weighted indices, such as the Dow Jones Industrial Average and the Nikkei 225, are followed widely as visible indicators of day-to-day market movements. The Nikkei 225 applies an adjustment factor to prevent highly priced stocks from dominating the index. Unlike a market-cap weighted index, a price-weighted index will need an alternative method of constituent selection. For example, the Nikkei 225 constituents are selected by a committee, by "considering the weights of the industrial sectors".
Equal weighting
This method gives each constituent stocks weights of 1/n, where n represents the number of stocks in the index. This method produces the least-concentrated portfolios. Equal weighting of stocks in an index is considered a naive strategy because it does not show preference towards any single stock. Zeng and Luo (2013) notes that broad market equally weighted indices are factor-indifferent and randomizes factor mispricing. Equal weight stock indices tend to overweight small-cap stocks and to underweight large-cap stocks compared to a market-cap weighted index. These biases usually result in higher volatility and lower liquidity than market-cap weight indices. An equally-weighted index may still select its constituents by market cap, for example the MSCI Equal Weighted Indexes use the same constituents as the corresponding free float-adjusted market capitalization weighted MSCI global equity indexes.
Fundamental factor weighting
This method, also known as fundamentally based indexes, weights constituent stocks based on arbitrarily selected "stock fundamental factors" rather stock financial market data. Fundamental factors could include sales, income, dividends, and other factors analyzed in fundamental analysis. Similar to fundamental analysis, fundamental weighting assumes that stock market prices will converge to an intrinsic price implied by fundamental attributes. Certain fundamental factors are also used in generic factor weighting indices.
Factor weighting
This method weights constituent stocks based on market risk factors of stocks as measured in the context of factor models, such as the Fama–French three-factor model. Such factors commonly include Growth, Value, Size, Yield, Momentum, Quality, and Volatility. Passive factor investing strategies are sometimes known as "smart beta" strategies. Investors could use factor investment strategies or portfolios to complement a market-cap weighted indexed portfolio by tilting or changing their portfolio exposure to certain factors.
Volatility weighting
This method weights constituent stocks by the inverse of their relative price volatility. Price volatility is defined differently by each index provider, but two common methods are the standard deviation of the past 252 trading days (approximately one calendar year), and the weekly standard deviation of price returns for the past 156 weeks (approximately three calendar years).
Minimum variance weighting
This method weights constituent stocks using a mean-variance optimization process. In a volatility weighted index, highly volatile stocks are given less weight in the index, while in a minimum variance weighting index, highly volatile stocks that are negatively correlated with the rest of the index can be given relatively larger weights than they would be given in the volatility weighted index.

== Presentation of index returns ==
Some indices, such as the S&P 500, have multiple versions. These versions can differ based on how the index components are weighted and on how dividends are accounted. For example, there are three versions of the S&P 500: price return, which only considers the price of the components, total return, which accounts for dividend reinvestment, and net total return, which accounts for dividend reinvestment after the deduction of a withholding tax.

The Wilshire 4500 and Wilshire 5000 indices have five versions each: full capitalization total return, full capitalization price, float-adjusted total return, float-adjusted price, and equal weight. The difference between the full capitalization, float-adjusted, and equal weight versions is in how index components are weighted.

== Indices and passive investment management ==
Passive management is an investing strategy involving investing in index funds, which are structured as mutual funds or exchange-traded funds that track market indices. The SPIVA (S&P Indices vs. Active) annual "U.S. Scorecard", which measures the performance of indices versus actively managed mutual funds, finds the vast majority of active management mutual funds underperform their benchmarks, such as the S&P 500 Index, after fees.

== Ethical stock market indices ==
In the interest of ethical investing, several indices include only companies that meet certain ecological or social criteria, such as the Calvert Social Index, Domini 400 Social Index, FTSE4Good Index, Dow Jones Sustainability Index, STOXX Global ESG Leaders Index, several Standard Ethics Aei indices, and the Wilderhill Clean Energy Index. Other ethical stock market indices may be based on diversity weighting.

As another example, the Organization of Islamic Cooperation in 2010 initiated a stock index that complies with Sharia's ban on alcohol, tobacco and gambling.

Critics of such initiatives argue that many firms satisfy mechanical "ethical criteria" (e.g., regarding board composition or hiring practices) but fail to perform ethically with respect to shareholders (e.g., Enron). Indeed, the seeming "seal of approval" of an ethical index may put investors more at ease, enabling scams. One response to these criticisms is that trust in the corporate management, index criteria, fund or index manager, and securities regulator, can never be replaced by mechanical means, so "market transparency" and "financial disclosure" are the only long-term-effective paths to fair markets. From a financial perspective, it is not obvious whether ethical indices or ethical funds will out-perform their more conventional counterparts. Theory might suggest that returns would be lower since the investible universe is artificially reduced and with it portfolio efficiency. (It conflicts with the Capital Asset Pricing Model, see above.) On the other hand, companies with good social performances might be better run, have more committed workers and customers, and be less likely to suffer reputation damage from incidents (oil spillages, industrial tribunals, etc.) and this might result in lower share price volatility, although such features, at least in theory, will have already been factored into the market price of the stock. The empirical evidence on the performance of ethical funds and of ethical firms versus their mainstream comparators is very mixed for both stock and debt markets.

== Index providers ==
For stock market indices, the major index providers are FTSE Russell, MSCI, and S&P Dow Jones Indices. Other providers include Cboe, Hang Seng Indexes, Morningstar Indexes, Nasdaq, Stoxx, and Wilshire Advisors.

== See also ==
- Index of accounting articles
- Index of economics articles
- Index of management articles
- List of stock exchanges
- List of stock market indices
- Outline of accounting
- Outline of marketing
