= List of assets owned by Berkshire Hathaway =

This is a list of subsidiaries, equities, cash, cash equivalents and short-term investments owned by multinational holding company Berkshire Hathaway.

== Cash, cash equivalents and U.S. Treasury Bills ==
As of September 30, 2026, Berkshire Hathaway had $352.3 billion in cash, cash equivalents and short-term investments in U.S. treasury bills.

== Operating subsidiaries ==
Companies for which Berkshire Hathaway owns wholly or controls a majority of voting shares:

Company	Sector	Ownership %	Acquisition Date (YYYY/MM/DD)	Acquisition Price	Notes
Acme Brick Company	Materials and Construction	100%	2000/08/01	~$600 Million	
Alleghany Corporation	Insurance	100%	2022/10/19	$11.6 billion	Included Alleghany subsidiary Kentucky Trailer, which designs and manufacturers trailers
AltaLink	Electric Transmission	100%	2014/12/01	C$3.24 Billion	A subsidiary of Berkshire Hathaway Energy. Became full owner in October 2024(from 92% to 100%)
Bell Laboratories	Rodent Control	100%	2025/07/31		
Ben Bridge Jeweler	Luxury Items	100%	2000/07/18		
Benjamin Moore & Co.	Materials and Construction	100%	2001	$1 Billion	
Berkadia	Mortgage Financing	50%	2009/12/31		Joint venture with Jefferies Financial Group, formerly known as Leucadia
Berkshire Hathaway Assurance	Insurance	100%	2007/12/01		
Berkshire Hathaway Automotive	Automotive	90%	2015/05/09	$4.1 Billion	Renamed from Van Tuyl Group
Berkshire Hathaway Direct Insurance Company (THREE)	Insurance	100%	2019		Renamed from American Centennial Insurance Company
Berkshire Hathaway Energy	Utilities	100%	1999/03/26	$2.05 Billion in 1999 for a 75% stake	Renamed from Mid-American Energy Holdings. Became full owner in October 2024(from 92% to 100%)
Berkshire Hathaway European Insurance	Insurance	100%	2019/03		A subsidiary of National Indemnity
Berkshire Hathaway Homestate Companies	Insurance	100%	1990		
Berkshire Hathaway International Insurance	Insurance	100%	1997		A subsidiary of National Indemnity
Berkshire Hathaway Life Insurance Company of Nebraska	Insurance	100%			
Berkshire Hathaway Specialty Insurance	Insurance	100%	2013		
BoatUS 20	Insurance		2007/07/27		
Borsheim's Fine Jewelry	Luxury Items	100%	1989		
Brooks Sports	Apparel	100%	2006/08/02		
BNSF Railway Company	Railroads and Logistics	100%	2010/02/12	$34 Billion	
Business Wire	Media	100%	2006/03/01		
CapSpecialty, Inc.	Insurance	100%	2022/10/19		Acquired in connection to the acquisition of Alleghany Corporation
Cavalier Homes	Materials and Construction	100%	2008		
Central States Indemnity	Insurance and Finance	100%	1992/10/20		
Charter Brokerage	Logistics	100%	2014/12/12		
Clayton Homes	Materials and Construction	100%	2007/05/10	$1.7 billion	
CORT Business Services	Furniture Related	100%	2000/01/14	$467 Million	
CTB Inc.	Capital Goods	100%	2002/10/31	$180 Million	
Dairy Queen	Food and Beverage	99%	1997/10/21	$585 Million	
Duracell	Household Products	100%	2016/02/29	$1.8 billion	
Ebby Halliday Companies	Real Estate	100%	2018/06/03		
Faraday	Insurance	100%	1998/12/21		A subsidiary of Gen Re
Fechheimer Brothers Company	Clothing	100%	1986		
FlightSafety International	Business Services	100%	1996/12/23	$1.5 Billion	
Forest River	Automotive	100%	2005/08/31		
Fruit of the Loom	Clothing	100%	2002/04/30	$835 Million	
Garanimals	Clothing	100%	2002/09/04		
Gateway Underwriters Agency	Insurance	100%	1967/03/01		Acquired in connection to the acquisition of National Indemnity Company
GEICO	Insurance and Finance	100%	1996/08/26	$2.3 Billion	
Gen Re	Insurance and Finance	100%	1998/12/21	$22 Billion	
GenStar	Insurance	100%	1998/12/21		A subsidiary of Gen Re
Genesis Insurance	Insurance	100%	1998/12/21		A subsidiary of Gen Re
Helzberg Diamonds	Luxury Items	100%	1995		
H.H. Brown Shoe Group	Clothing	100%	1991/07/01		
International Metalworking Companies (IMC)	Materials and Construction	100%	2006/05/08	$5 billion in 2006 for an 80% stake; $2.05 billion in 2013 for an additional 20%	
ISCAR Metalworking	Materials and Construction	100%	2006/05/08		Acquired in connection to the acquisition of International Metalworking Companies (IMC)
Jazwares	Toys	100%	2022/10/19		Acquired in connection to the acquisition of Alleghany Corporation
Johns Manville	Materials and Construction	100%	2001/02/27	$1.8 Billion	
Jordan's Furniture	Furniture Related	100%	1999/10/11		
Justin Brands	Clothing	100%	2000/08/01	$570 Million	
Kansas Bankers Surety Company	Insurance and Finance	100%	1998/04/10	$80 Million	Acquired through Wesco Financial
Kern River Pipeline	Pipeline	100%	2006/03/21	$960 Million	A subsidiary of Berkshire Hathaway Energy Became full owner in October 2024(from 92% to 100%)
Larson-Juhl	Furniture Related	100%	2001/12/17		
Louis Motor	Motorcycles	100%	2015/02/20		
Lubrizol	Chemicals	100%	2011/09/16	$9.7 Billion	
Marmon Group	Diversified Holding Company	99.7%	2008	$4.5 Billion in 2008 for 63.6% stake; $1.5 Billion in 2010 for 16.6%, $1.4 Billion in 2012 for 9.8% and $1.47 Billion in 2013 for 9.7%	
McLane Company	Logistics	100%	2003/05/23	$1.45 Billion	
Medical Protective	Liability Insurance	100%	2005/06/30	$825 Million	
MiTek	Materials and Construction	90%	2001/07/31	$400 Million	Other 10% owned by MiTek management
MLMIC Insurance Company	Insurance	100%	2018		
National Indemnity Company	Insurance and Finance	100%	1967/03/01	$6.8 Million	
Nebraska Furniture Mart	Furniture Related	90%	1983	$60 Million	
NetJets	Business Services	100%	1998	$725 Million	
New England Asset Management (NEAM)	Finance	100%	1998/12/21		A subsidiary of Gen Re
Northern Natural Gas	Pipeline	100%	2002/08/01	$928 Million	A subsidiary of Berkshire Hathaway Energy Became full owner in October 2024(from 92% to 100%)
NV Energy	Electric & Gas Distribution	100%	2013/12/19	$5.6 Billion	A subsidiary of Berkshire Hathaway Energy Became full owner in October 2024(from 92% to 100%)
Oriental Trading Company	Toy Party Craft	100%	2012/11/02		
OxyChem	Chemicals	100%	2025/10/02	$9.7 Billion	
PacifiCorp	Electric Distribution	100%	2005	$9.4 billion	A subsidiary of Berkshire Hathaway Energy Became full owner in October 2024(from 92% to 100%)
Pampered Chef	Food and Beverage	100%	2002/09/23		
Pilot Flying J	Retail, Food and Beverage, Petroleum	100%	2017/10/03	$2.76 billion in 2017 for a 38.6% Pilot stake; $8.2bn in 2023 for an additional 41.4%	Initially started with a 38.6% stake in 2017. Became a full owner in January 2024.
Precision Castparts Corp.	Aerospace and Defense	100%	2016/01/29	$37 Billion	
Precision Steel Warehouse, Inc.	Materials and Construction	100%	1979/02/28	$15 Million for 80% in 1979	Acquired through Wesco Financial
RC Willey Home Furnishings	Furniture Related	100%	1995/06/29		
Richline Group	Wholesale and Manufacturing	100%	2007/05/01		
Russell Brands	Sports Equipment Manufacturer	100%	2006	$600 Million	A division of Fruit of the Loom
Scott Fetzer Company	Other	100%	1985	$230 Million	
See's Candies	Food and Beverage	100%	1972/01/03	$25 Million	
SE Homes	Materials and Construction	100%	2007		
Shaw Industries	Materials and Construction	100%	2002/01/21	$2 billion in 2001 for 87.3%; $354.6 million in stock in 2002 for the remaining 12.7%	
RSUI Group, Inc.	Insurance	100%	2022/10/19		Acquired in connection to the acquisition of Alleghany Corporation
Star Furniture	Furniture Related	100%	1997/07/14		
TaeguTec	Materials and Construction	100%	2006/05/08		Acquired in connection to the acquisition of International Metalworking Companies (IMC)
Taylor Morrison	Construction	100%	2026/07/24	$6.8 billion	
TransRe	Insurance	100%	2022/10/19		Acquired in connection to the acquisition of Alleghany Corporation
TTI, Inc.	Electronic Component Distribution	100%	2007/03/30		
Tungaloy Corporation	Materials and Construction	100%	2006/05/08		Acquired in connection to the acquisition of International Metalworking Companies (IMC)
United States Liability Insurance Group	Insurance and Finance	100%	2000/08/08		
Wesco Financial	Insurance and Finance	100%	1978	$547.6 million in 2011 for 19.9%	Business units dissolved into Berkshire Hathaway
World Book Encyclopedia	Media	100%	1985	$230 Million as part of the Scott Fetzer Company deal	A subsidiary of Scott Fetzer Company
WPLG-TV	Media	100%	2014/07/01		
XTRA Lease	Commercial Semi Trailer Rental and Leasing	100%	2001/09/20	$590 million	

== U.S.-listed public companies ==
Sourced from Berkshire Hathaway's Form 13F-HR filed with the Securities and Exchange Commission, as of September 30, 2026:

Company	Ticker	Sector	Ownership %	# of Shares	Value	As of Date
Ally Financial	NYSE: ALLY	Financial Services	9.00	27,000,000	$1,015,741,000	Sep 30, 2026
Alphabet, Inc. Class A	Nasdaq: GOOGL	Technology	1.34	78,791,167	$27,110,465,000	Sep 30, 2026
Alphabet, Inc. Class C	Nasdaq: GOOG	Technology	0.49	27,188,433	$9,264,187,000	Sep 30, 2026
American Express	NYSE: AXP	Financial Services	22.61	151,610,700	$46,104,814,000	Sep 30, 2026
Apple Inc.	Nasdaq: AAPL	Technology	1.57	227,917,808	$75,901,188,000	Sep 30, 2026
Bank of America	NYSE: BAC	Banking	6.59	455,860,908	$24,812,510,000	Sep 30, 2026
Bending Spoons	Nasdaq: BSP	Technology	4.67	30,689,655	$1,257,662,062	Oct 14, 2026
Capital One Financial	NYSE: COF	Banking	0.19	1,150,000	$222,031,000	Sep 30, 2026
Chevron Corporation	NYSE: CVX	Petroleum	4.27	84,375,856	$17,230,394,000	Sep 30, 2026
Chubb	NYSE: CB	Insurance	8.96	34,249,183	$11,139,547,000	Sep 30, 2026
The Coca-Cola Company	NYSE: KO	Food & Drink	9.30	400,000,000	$34,432,001,000	Sep 30, 2026
D.R. Horton	NYSE: DHI	Building Construction	0.00	3,564	$487,000	Sep 30, 2026
DaVita	NYSE: DVA	Healthcare	45.02	28,314,666	$5,308,999,875	Oct 27, 2026
Delta Air Lines	NYSE: DAL	Airline Services	9.80	64,450,000	$5,378,997,000	Sep 30, 2026
Jefferies Financial Group	NYSE: JEF	Financial Services	0.23	433,558	$19,827,000	Sep 30, 2026
Kraft Heinz	Nasdaq: KHC	Food & Drink	27.46	325,634,818	$7,398,423,000	Sep 30, 2026
Kroger	NYSE: KR	Retail	5.93	35,000,000	$2,051,701,000	Sep 30, 2026
Lennar Corporation Class A	NYSE: LEN	Building Construction	13.68	28,438,045	$2,164,988,365	Oct 5, 2026
Lennar Corporation Class B	NYSE: LEN.B	Building Construction	1.89	568,028	$43,028,121	Oct 5, 2026
Liberty Live Series A	Nasdaq: LLYVA	Media	19.50	4,986,588	$471,931,000	Sep 30, 2026
Liberty Live Series C	Nasdaq: LLYVK	Media	16.57	10,587,143	$1,029,599,000	Sep 30, 2026
Louisiana-Pacific	NYSE: LPX	Building Construction	8.10	5,664,793	$365,663,000	Sep 30, 2026
Macy's	NYSE: M	Consumer Discretionary	2.79	7,538,800	$171,659,000	Sep 30, 2026
Moody's Corporation	NYSE: MCO	Financial Services	14.31	24,669,778	$11,203,287,000	Sep 30, 2026
The New York Times Company	NYSE: NYT	Media	9.78	15,700,000	$1,000,090,000	Sep 30, 2026
Nucor	NYSE: NUE	Steel	0.70	1,580,776	$369,506,000	Sep 30, 2026
NVR Inc	NYSE: NVR	Industrials	0.42	11,112	$68,388,000	Sep 30, 2026
Occidental Petroleum	NYSE: OXY	Petroleum	26.50	264,941,431	$14,656,560,000	Sep 30, 2026
SiriusXM	Nasdaq: SIRI	Media	37.37	125,731,398	$3,872,527,058	Nov 3, 2026
Verisign	Nasdaq: VRSN	Technology	6.60	5,922,136	$1,670,102,000	Sep 30, 2026

Combined, these holdings had a market value of $304,196,581,325 as of September 30, 2026.

== Non-U.S.-listed public companies ==
Sourced from a few of sources, Berkshire Hathaway and its subsidiaries own the following Non-US public companies:

Company	Ticker	Sector	Ownership	# of Shares	Value (USD)	As of Date	Sources
Insurance Australia Group	ASX: IAG	Insurance	4.17	97,513,199	$550,100,000	July 9, 2025	
ITOCHU Corporation	TYO: 8001	General trading	10.07	704,799,500	$8,712,900,000	March 2, 2026	
Marubeni Corporation	TYO: 8002	General trading	10.32	171,439,700	$5,365,651,154	June 25, 2026	
Mitsubishi Corporation	TYO: 8058	General trading	11.06	410,339,800	$12,766,400,000	April 30, 2026	
Mitsui & Co., Ltd	TYO: 8031	General trading	10.83	310,311,400	$8,998,223,790	June 24, 2026	
Naito & Co., Ltd.	TYO: 7624	General trading	5.15	2,824,000	$2,700,000	August 31, 2026	
Sumitomo Corporation	TYO: 8053	General trading	10.30	123,129,300	$5,628,300,000	May 12, 2026	
Tokio Marine	TYO: 8766	Insurance	2.47	48,207,200	$2,258,862,052	March 23, 2026	
YG-1 Co., Ltd.	KRX: 019210	Manufacturer	14.52	5,400,000	$76,400,000	June 30, 2026	

== Former subsidiaries ==
Company	Sector	Ownership %	Disposal Date	Notes
H. J. Heinz Company	Foods	52.5%	July 2, 2015	Merged into Kraft-Heinz
Applied Underwriters	Insurance	100%	July 13, 2019	Sold
The Buffalo News	Media	100%	Mar 16, 2020	Sold
