= Tracy Britt Cool =

American business executive (born 1984)

- Born: September 7, 1984 (age 41); Manhattan, Kansas
- Education: Harvard University; Harvard Business School
- Occupations: Business executive, entrepreneur
- Employer: Kanbrick
- Spouse: Scott Cool (m. 2013)

Tracy Britt Cool (born September 7, 1984, in Manhattan, Kansas) is an American business executive and entrepreneur who was widely noted as a Warren Buffett protégé. She chaired four Berkshire Hathaway subsidiaries before co-founding Kanbrick, a private equity firm, in 2020.

== Background ==
Britt Cool was born and raised on a farm in Manhattan, Kansas, where, by about age 10, she operated her own produce stand.

She graduated from Harvard Business School with an MBA in 2009, where, as an undergraduate, she had interned at 85 Broads, Bank of America, and Lehman Brothers. Britt Cool served as president of Harvard Undergraduate Women in Business (HUWIB) and was voted "Most Likely to Become a Billionaire". She was a member of the Zeta Xi chapter of Kappa Alpha Theta. In 2006, while an undergraduate at Harvard, she co-founded Smart Woman Securities with future screenwriter Teresa Hsiao, which educates its members on investments.

== Career ==
Hired following her 2009 graduation, Britt Cool became the financial assistant and noted protégé of Berkshire Hathaway chairman Warren Buffett. In 2012, she was featured among "40 Under 40: Hottest Young Stars in Business" by Fortune magazine, then named to its "40 Under 40" list of emerging leaders in 2013. In 2014, she was named to the Forbes list of 30 Under 30 influencers on global cashflow.

In October 2014, she was named CEO of Pampered Chef. Overseeing over $4 billion in annual sales and a workforce of over 10,000, Britt Cool has chaired four Berkshire subsidiaries: Larson-Juhl, Johns Manville, Oriental Trading Company, and Benjamin Moore and also served on the board of H. J. Heinz.

On September 18, 2019, Britt Cool announced her resignation from Berkshire Hathaway and its subsidiaries, including her intention to step down from Kraft Heinz's board in the first quarter of 2020. She left the firms in order to co-found Kanbrick, a private equity firm in Chicago, Illinois, with former Pampered Chef CFO Brian Humphrey. In an interview with The Wall Street Journal, Britt Cool said that she wanted to work with and acquire "businesses too small for Berkshire," mimicking its business model for smaller companies. Kanbrick closed its first deal in July 2020, acquiring an interest in Thirty-One Gifts.

Britt Cool is also a non-executive director of acquisition vehicle EverArc Holdings Ltd. which raised $340 million in an IPO.

== Personal life ==
She married Omaha attorney Scott Cool in September 2013. Warren Buffett walked Britt Cool down the aisle during the ceremony.
