= Berkshire Hathaway Annual Meeting =

Annual shareholders meeting of American company

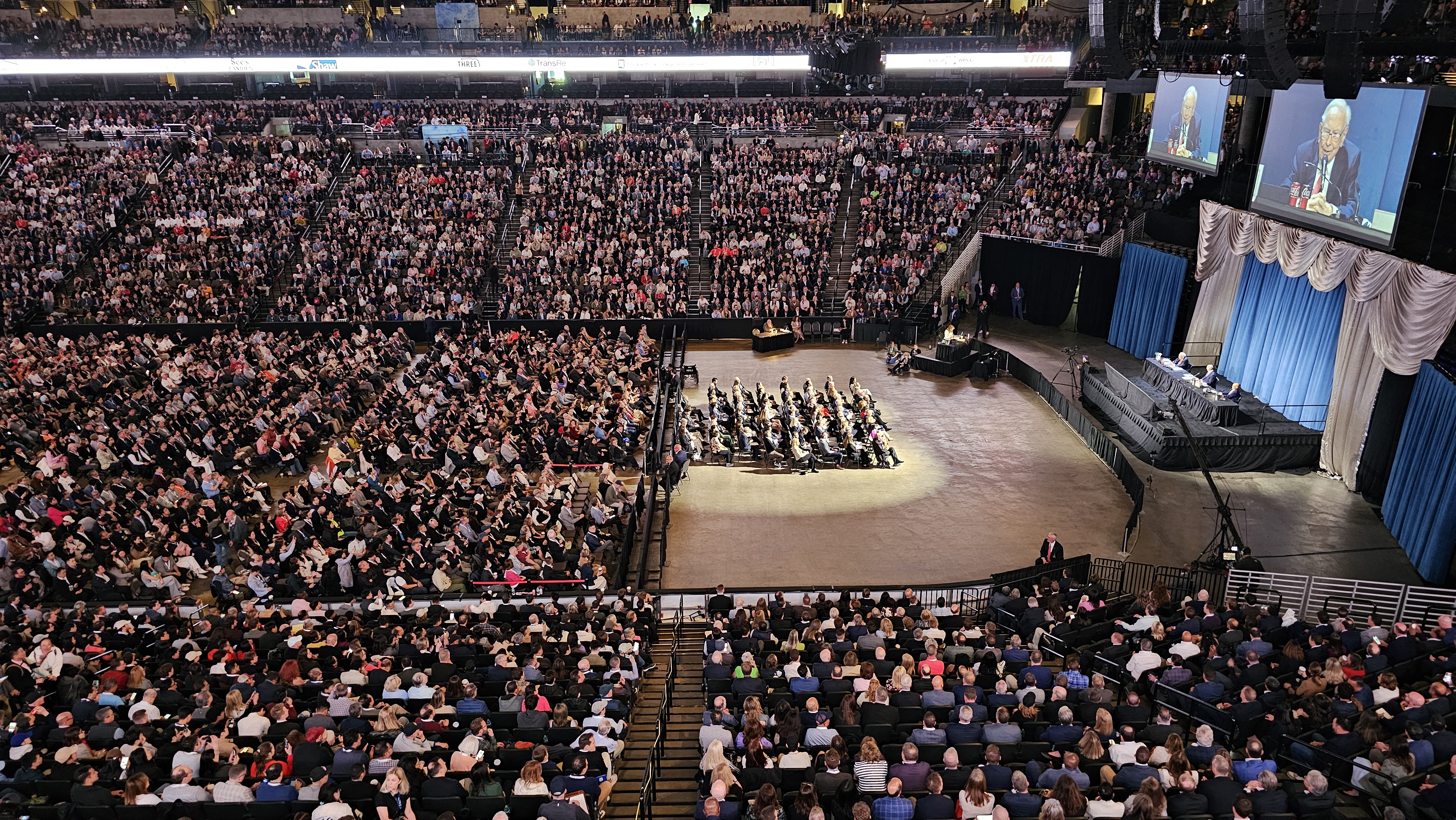
Berkshire Hathaway Annual Meeting 2025

The Berkshire Hathaway Annual Meeting is the annual shareholders meeting of Berkshire Hathaway Inc., held each May in Omaha, Nebraska. The event is also known as "Woodstock for Capitalists,". It has grown from a small gathering of approximately a dozen attendees in 1965 into one of the largest investor gatherings in the world, drawing up to 40,000 shareholders annually at its peak. It holds the Guinness World Record for the largest annual general meeting attendance of any company.

== Overview ==
The meeting is held on the first Saturday of May at the CHI Health Center Omaha, a combined arena and convention center in downtown Omaha that opened in 2003. When the first Saturday in May is on the Mother's Day weekend, the Annual Meeting will be held in April. Its central feature is an extended Q&A session, typically lasting five to six hours, during which Berkshire Hathaway's senior leadership responds to questions from shareholders and accredited journalists.

Attendance is open to Berkshire Hathaway shareholders, who receive up to four meeting credentials upon request. One is for them and up to three can be shared with guests. Credentials serve both as admission tickets and as passes granting access to shareholder discounts at Berkshire-owned businesses throughout the weekend.

== History ==
=== Origins ===
The first annual meeting under Warren Buffett's control took place in 1965 in the employee break room of a Berkshire-owned insurance company in Omaha, with approximately a dozen attendees. As press attention grew — including an early report by Omaha World-Herald journalist Robert Dorr in 1966 — Buffett moved the meeting through a succession of larger venues, including the recital hall at the Joslyn Art Museum, the Orpheum Theater, a Holiday Inn convention center, and the Omaha Civic Auditorium, before settling at the CHI Health Center from 2003 onward. Buffett specified Saturday meetings to avoid disrupting downtown business and to accommodate working shareholders.

=== Growth in attendance ===
Attendance grew steadily across decades, from approximately 24 in 1979 to 1,000 in 1986, 13,000 in 2000, and 21,000 in 2005. An estimated 42,000 attended the 2015 meeting, marking Buffett's 50th anniversary running the company. The Guinness World Record for the largest AGM attendance was set at the 2017 meeting, estimated at 42,000 people.

=== The Buffett–Munger era ===
For decades, the meeting's central draw was the joint appearance of Buffett and Charlie Munger, Berkshire's vice chairman from 1978 until his death in November 2023. The two men presided over the Q&A session together, with Buffett's lengthier and more diplomatic answers complemented by Munger's characteristically brief and pointed remarks. Their combined appearances were widely compared to a long-running comedy partnership, and their commentary on business, investing, and public affairs was closely followed by the financial press.

=== Pandemic meetings (2020–2021) ===
The COVID-19 pandemic led to significant changes to the meeting format. The 2020 meeting was held virtually for the first time, streamed by Yahoo Finance, with no shareholders present in person. The 2021 meeting was also held without public attendance, moving to Los Angeles so that Munger, who lived in California, could participate alongside Buffett. In-person attendance resumed in 2022, though Berkshire expected turnout to be "considerably less" than the pre-pandemic norm.

=== Post-Buffett era ===
Following Munger's death in November 2023 and Buffett's retirement as CEO at the end of 2025, Greg Abel presided over the 2026 meeting as CEO for the first time, joined by members of Berkshire's leadership team including BNSF Railway CEO Katie Farmer and NetJets president Adam Johnson. Buffett participated from the audience as non-executive chairman.

== Format ==
=== The annual film ===
Each meeting opens with a humorous film produced by Berkshire, featuring Buffett and a rotating cast of celebrities and Berkshire executives. The doors open at 7:00 a.m. and the film is shown at approximately 8:30 a.m., before the formal Q&A session begins at 9:30 a.m.

=== Question-and-answer session ===
The Q&A session is the centerpiece of the day and typically runs for five to six hours with a short break for lunch. Questions are taken from a combination of shareholders at floor microphones and from Becky Quick, representing CNBC.

=== Berkshire Bazaar of Bargains ===
The exhibition hall adjacent to the arena hosts what Berkshire calls the "Berkshire Bazaar of Bargains," a shopping event featuring products and services from the conglomerate's subsidiaries at discounted prices. Participating businesses have included GEICO, See's Candies, Fruit of the Loom, Brooks Running, Dairy Queen, and others. The exhibition hall opens to shareholders on the Friday afternoon before the meeting and remains open through the weekend.

== Surrounding events ==
The formal meeting is the centerpiece of a broader weekend of activities in Omaha. A 5-kilometre charity run, organised each year, takes place on the morning of the meeting or the day before. Numerous independently organised value investing conferences, networking dinners, and gatherings for investors take place across the city from Wednesday through Sunday of meeting week. These up to 70 satellite events have grown substantially alongside the main meeting, attracting participants from across the investment management industry who use the week as an opportunity to meet peers and potential investors.

== Economic impact ==
The meeting has a significant economic impact on Omaha. The 2019 meeting, the last held in person before the COVID-19 pandemic, was estimated to have contributed $21.3 million to the local economy. Hotel occupancy in Omaha approaches 100% during meeting week, and air traffic to Eppley Airfield increases substantially. Nebraska received roughly 15,000 international visitors during the 2024 meeting weekend.

== Livestreaming ==
Beginning in 2018, the Q&A session has been livestreamed, initially via Yahoo Finance and subsequently via CNBC, which has served as the exclusive live broadcast partner since 2019. The livestream has expanded global access to the meeting significantly, with millions of viewers watching online in years when Buffett's commentary attracted particular attention.

== See also ==
- Berkshire Hathaway
- Warren Buffett
- Charlie Munger
- Greg Abel
- CHI Health Center Omaha
- Value investing
