= Ajit Jain =

Indian-American executive (born 1951)

- Born: Sundargarh, Odisha, India
- Citizenship: United States
- Education: IIT Kharagpur (B.Tech); Harvard University (MBA)
- Occupation: Businessman
- Title: Vice Chairman of Insurance Operations, Berkshire Hathaway
- Board member of: Berkshire Hathaway
- Spouse: Tinku Jain (m. 1981)
- Relatives: Anshu Jain (cousin)

Ajit Jain (born 23 July 1951) is an Indian-American executive who is the Vice Chairman of Insurance Operations for Berkshire Hathaway as of January 10, 2018. Ajit Jain is an older cousin of Anshu Jain, who was the former Co-CEO of Deutsche Bank.

== Education ==
Jain attended Stewart School in Cuttack. In 1972, he graduated from the IIT Kharagpur in India with a B.Tech in Mechanical Engineering.

== Career ==
From 1973 to 1976, Jain worked for IBM as a salesman for their data-processing operations in India. He was named "Rookie of the Year" in his region in 1973. He lost his job in 1976 when IBM discontinued their operations in India because they declined to allow Indian ownership of the company, as was then required by law.

In 1978, Jain moved to the United States, where he earned an MBA from Harvard University and joined McKinsey & Co. He returned to India in the early 1980s and married. The Jains then moved back to the United States, as Jain's wife preferred to live there.

In 1986, he left McKinsey to work on insurance operations for Warren Buffett. Jain was invited by his former boss, Michael Goldberg, who had left McKinsey to join Berkshire Hathaway in 1982. At the time, he said he knew little about the insurance business.

In the annual letter to shareholders on 2014, it was suggested that both Jain and Greg Abel could be appropriate successors for Warren Buffett as CEO of Berkshire Hathaway. In January 2018, Jain was named Berkshire Hathaway's vice chair of insurance operations and appointed to Berkshire's board of directors.

== Philanthropy ==
Jain lives in the New York City area.

In 2005, Jain established the Jain Foundation, a non-profit organization located in Seattle, Washington, the mission of which is to cure limb-girdle muscular dystrophies caused by dysferlin protein deficiency, a condition that Jain's son has.
