= Campbell Hausfeld =

American manufacturing company

- Company type: Subsidiary
- Industry: Consumer products
- Founded: 1836
- Founders: James Campbell; William Campbell; Joseph Hausfeld
- Headquarters: Harrison, Ohio
- Products: Air compressors, spray guns and related equipment
- Parent: Berkshire Hathaway

Campbell Hausfeld is a manufacturer of consumer, industrial, and commercial grade, low priced air compressors and related products, based in Harrison, Ohio. It is a major subsidiary of the Marmon Group which in turn is part of Berkshire Hathaway. It is one of the oldest companies in Ohio.

== History ==
The company was founded in 1836 and manufactured farm equipment. In 1940 it acquired Joseph Hausfeld's company which was the manufacturer of an air-compressor called Pressure King and was renamed Campbell-Hausfeld. In 1971 Campbell Hausfeld was acquired by Scott Fetzer. In 2015 the company was acquired by The Marmon Group. The company also manufactures air tools, painting systems, winches, generators, pressure washers, and spray guns.
