= Economic moat =

Economic term by Warren Buffett

An economic moat, often attributed to investor Warren Buffett, is a term used to describe a company's competitive advantage. Like a moat protects a castle, certain advantages help protect companies from their competitors.

== History ==
As of 2012, Buffett had used the word "moat" in the Berkshire Hathaway shareholder letters more than 20 times since 1986. The 2016 shareholder letter is the most recent letter to contain the word moat.

== Types of economic moats ==
Examples of some economic moats are network effect, intangible assets, cost advantage, switching costs, and efficient scale.

Network effect: A network effect happens when the "value of a good or service grows" as it's used by existing and new customers. An example is Amazon.

Intangible assets: Brand identity, think Nike or Apple; patents; and government licenses are examples of intangible assets.

Cost advantage: Companies that can keep their prices low can maintain market share and discourage competition. Walmart has cost advantage.

Switching costs: Customers and suppliers might be less likely to change companies or providers if the move will incur monetary costs, time delays, or extra effort.

Efficient scale: Companies that have a natural monopoly—or operate in markets or industries where there are few rivals—benefit from efficient scale. Utility companies are examples.

== See also ==
- Barriers to entry
