= Borsheims =

Jewelry store based in Omaha, Nebraska

Coordinates: 41.25994422°N 96.07192365°W

- Type: Subsidiary
- Industry: Retail
- Founded: 1870; 156 years ago in Omaha, Nebraska, United States
- Founder: Louis Borsheim
- Headquarters: Omaha, Nebraska, United States
- Area served: United States
- Key people: Karen Goracke (president and CEO)
- Products: Jewelry; Watches; Home Decor
- Parent: Berkshire Hathaway
- Website: www.borsheims.com

Borsheims (/ˈbɔːrʃaɪmz/ BOR-shymze) is a luxury jewelry store that sells fine jewelry, timepieces, engagement rings and home décor in Omaha, Nebraska. In 1870, Norwegian immigrant and silversmith Louis Borsheims founded his independent jewelry business that would later become known as Borsheims. The luxury jewelry retailer began as Brown and Borsheim. In 1907, Louis A. Borsheim sold his interests in Brown and Borsheim, thus began the Omaha staple, Borsheims. The business was sold to Louis Friedman and Simon Gorelick in 1947. In 1950, Louis bought out his brother in law, Simon Gorelick and his son Ike joined the business, who both retained the Borsheims name. In 1980, Ike Friedman bought out his father, Louis. Ike's son Alan and son in law, Marvin Cohn joined the business. In 1985, his other son in law, Donald Yale joined the business. His two daughters, Janis Yale and Susie Cohn also worked in the business.

In 1986, Borsheims moved to the Regency Court Mall. In 1989, investor Warren Buffett purchased a majority of Borsheims stock, making it part of his holding company, Berkshire Hathaway. It was the first of Berkshire Hathaway’s jewelry companies and the business is still part of its portfolio, being also featured in Buffett's letters to shareholders and used for its annual shareholder meeting in Omaha, Nebraska. Donald Yale stayed CEO until 1994, and when he retired, Buffett offered Susan Jacques the job of running the business. Ike Friedman died in 1991 and Donald Yale was named President and CEO. Alan Friedman left the business. Donald Yale served in that post until he retired in 1994. Susan Jacques was named his successor.

Borsheims is now led by Karen Goracke, who became Borsheims president and CEO in 2013. The store maintains an inventory that includes more than 50,000 pieces of jewelry and watches.

It has been the location of Berkshire shareholder-only events held in association with its annual general meeting.
