= Gen Re =

American reinsurance company

General Reinsurance Corporation
- Company type: Subsidiary
- Industry: Insurance
- Founded: 1921; 105 years ago (General Reinsurance Corp.); 1846; 180 years ago (Kölnische Rückversicherung)
- Headquarters: Stamford, Connecticut, United States
- Area served: Worldwide
- Key people: Charlie Shamieh (chairman); Kara Raiguel (president and CEO)
- Products: Reinsurance
- Parent: Berkshire Hathaway
- Website: genre.com

General Reinsurance Corporation is an American multinational property/casualty and life/health reinsurance company offering a range of reinsurance products and services. The company is a primarily direct reinsurer and is represented in all major reinsurance markets worldwide through a network of more than 40 offices. Gen Re is a wholly owned subsidiary of Berkshire Hathaway Inc.

Financial strength ratings of Gen Re's reinsurance operations:

- A.M. Best: A++ (Superior)
- Standard & Poor's Claims Paying Ability Rating: AA+
- Moody's Financial Strength Rating: Aa1

General Re Corporation is the holding company for Gen Re's global reinsurance and related operations. It owns General Reinsurance Corporation, General Re Life Corporation and General Reinsurance AG, the direct reinsurers which conduct business as Gen Re. In addition, the insurance, reinsurance and investment management companies in the General Re group include: Gen Re Intermediaries, NEAM, General Star, Genesis, USAU and Faraday.

== History ==
General Reinsurance Corporation’s history began in 1921 as the General Casualty and Surety Reinsurance Corporation, before it took over the U.S. business of the Norwegian Globe Insurance Company of Christiania, Norway.

In 1923, American investors acquired the company and changed the name to General Reinsurance Corporation.

In 1928, the General Alliance Corporation was organized to acquire and hold the shares of General Reinsurance Corporation, as well as a half interest in the holdings of the Royal Exchange Assurance Group (London) in the United British Insurance Co., Ltd.

In 1929, the General Alliance Corporation owned all the stock of General Reinsurance Corporation, and jointly with the Royal Exchange Group, a controlling interest in the United British. The United British Insurance Co., Ltd. established a U.S. branch that transacted casualty reinsurance as a "running mate for the General, and has the same management as the General. The two companies transact practically all forms of casualty and surety reinsurance and constitute the first example of a 'Group' in the history of American casualty reinsurance."

Also in 1929, General Reinsurance affirmed that it would be only a direct reinsurer. In 1945, General Reinsurance merged with Mellon Indemnity Corporation. In 1954, the company created the first professional casualty facultative reinsurance department. Property facultative followed, beginning in 1956. North America branch offices were opened during this time. In the 1950s, General Reinsurance began writing reinsurance internationally, expanding in this area during the 1960s and 1970s. The company continued to grow through the next two decades, opening more U.S. and Canada branch offices and making various acquisitions. The company moved its headquarters from New York City to Greenwich, Connecticut in 1974, and then to Stamford, Connecticut in 1984. In 1980, General Re Corporation, the parent holding company, was formed and listed on the New York Stock Exchange as GRN.

In 1994, General Reinsurance Corporation formed an alliance with what was then Cologne Re (Kölnische Rückversicherungs-Gesellschaft, which was founded in 1846), now General Reinsurance AG. In 1998, General Re Corporation was acquired by Berkshire Hathaway Inc., and in 2003 General Reinsurance Corporation and Cologne Re began marketing under the brand name of Gen Re. In 2009, General Reinsurance Corporation completed its purchase of Cologne Re, whose name was changed to General Reinsurance AG in 2010.

=== AIG Securities Fraud ===
In October 2000, some Wall Street analysts questioned the decline in American International Group (AIG) loss reserves. In an effort to quell these concerns, AIG entered into two sham reinsurance transactions with Cologne Re Dublin, a subsidiary of General Reinsurance, that had no economic substance but were designed to add $500 million in phony loss reserves to AIG’s balance sheet in the fourth quarter of 2000 and first quarter of 2001.

In 2005, New York Attorney General Eliot Spitzer began an investigation into the two reinsurance transactions. Soon afterwards, AIG came under market pressure, and admitted it had undertaken what could be construed as securities fraud. The staff admitted that the two reinsurance transactions had inflated AIG’s balance sheet and propped up AIG’s stock price. In the resultant stock crash, investors lost $500 million in investments.

Cologne Re Dublin's CEO, John Houldsworth, agreed to turn state's witness for the Department of Justice (DOJ) and Securities and Exchange Commission, in agreement for a plea bargain. Houldsworth then pleaded guilty to conspiring to commit securities fraud, resultantly facing a sentence of up to five years in prison and $250,000 in fines. The final sentencing was placed on hold, subject to consequential SEC prosecutions.

The DOJ subsequently undertook successful prosecutions against four former Gen Re executives and one former AIG executive: CEO Ronald Ferguson was sentenced to two years in prison and fined $200,000; CFO Elizabeth Monrad was sentenced to 18 months in prison and fined $250,000; Senior Vice President Christopher Garand was sentenced to a year and a day in prison and fined $150,000; Senior Vice President and Assistant General Counsel Robert Graham was sentenced to a year and a day in prison and fined $100,000; AIG's Vice President Christian Milton was sentenced to four years in prison and fined $200,000.

In 2009, in front of U.S. District Judge Christopher Droney in Hartford, Houldsworth apologized. As a result, he was fined $5,000 and ordered to perform 400 hours of community service during a two-year probation period.

On August 1, 2011, the United States Court of Appeals for the Second Circuit vacated the five Gen Re and AIG defendants’ convictions and remanded the defendants for a new trial, holding that the reported drop in share prices could not be attributed to the two reinsurance deals.

==== Resolution ====
"In June 2012, the U.S. government agreed to not pursue any further legal action against the former Gen Re executives pursuant to deferred prosecution agreements that have since expired and are no longer in effect. As a result, the government matter is fully and finally resolved. Civil litigation related to the AIG matter has also been fully and finally resolved. The lead plaintiffs and Gen Re reached a settlement agreement which the court approved pursuant to a final order entered on September 11, 2013."

== Office locations ==
Gen Re's headquarters are in Stamford, Connecticut.

In North America, Gen Re also operates in Atlanta, Boston, Chicago, Columbus, Dallas, Hartford, Kansas City, Los Angeles, Montreal, New York, Philadelphia, San Francisco, Seattle, South Portland, St. Paul and Toronto.

Gen Re further operates in Latin America (Mexico City, São Paulo), Europe/Middle East (Cologne, Copenhagen, Dubai, London, Madrid, Milan, Moscow, Paris, Vienna), Africa (Cape Town, Johannesburg), Asia (Beijing, Hong Kong, Mumbai, Seoul, Shanghai, Singapore, Taipei, Tokyo) and Australasia (Auckland, Sydney).
