= RC Willey Home Furnishings =

American home furnishings company

RC Willey
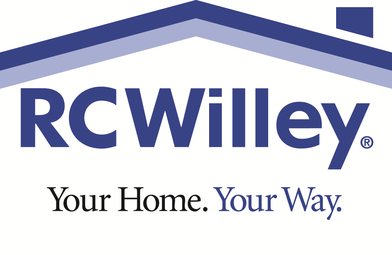
- Company type: Subsidiary
- Industry: Retail
- Founded: 1932; 94 years ago in Syracuse, Utah, United States
- Founder: Rufus Call Willey
- Headquarters: Salt Lake City, Utah, United States
- Area served: Western United States
- Key people: William H. Child (Chairman); Scott Hymas (CEO); Jeff Child (President); Curtis Child (CFO)
- Products: Furniture; Electronics; Home appliances Mattresses; Flooring
- Owner: Berkshire Hathaway
- Website: www.rcwilley.com

RC Willey Home Furnishings (RC Willey) is an American home furnishings company in Utah, Idaho, Nevada and California. It was founded in 1932 by Rufus Call Willey in Syracuse, Utah, RC. He began selling Hotpoint-brand appliances door-to-door out of the back of his pickup truck. RC Willey has 13 locations across the Western United States and specializes in furniture, electronics, home appliances, mattresses, and flooring. In 1995, the holding company Berkshire Hathaway bought RC Willey in a deal with Warren Buffett.

== History ==
RC Willey was founded in 1932 in Syracuse, Utah, then a farming community.

In 1932 Rufus Call Willey began selling Hotpoint Brand appliances door-to-door in Syracuse, Utah. Employed by the local electric company, he first started selling appliances from the back of his pick-up truck on the side as he made his rounds. To guarantee customer satisfaction, Willey would lend out appliances for a week so that people could try them out. He also let them finance the purchases in installments over a three-year period, payable at harvest time. In 1950 he built his first store next door to his home in Syracuse.

In 1954, Willey left the company due to terminal cancer. William H. Child, who had married Willey's daughter Darlene three years earlier, took over the business. William Child is credited with adding furniture to the company's appliance offerings.

Berkshire Hathaway, Inc., the holding company led by billionaire investor Warren Buffett, acquired RC Willey on May 24, 1995.

In 1998, RC Willey's South Salt Lake location became the site of a "Whaling Wall" mural by the famous marine artist Wyland.

Chief financial officer Scott L. Hymas, who had been with the company since 1987, succeeded Bill Child as CEO in February 2001. Child remained chairman. At the same time, Bill Child's nephew, Jeffrey S. Child, became the company's president.

=== Timeline ===
Timeline
Year	Event
1932	Rufus Call Willey begins selling appliances door-to-door.
1950	RC Willey opens its first store in Syracuse, Utah.
1954	William H. Child takes over the business.
1969	A second store opens in Murray, Utah.
1990	Six stores have sales of $100 million.
1995	Berkshire Hathaway, Inc. acquires the company.
1999	RC Willey expands outside Utah with Meridian, Idaho, store
2019	Original RC Willey closes
