= Scott Fetzer Company =

American branding and marketing manufacturing firm

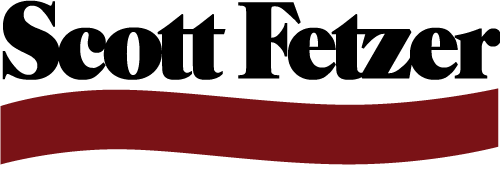
- Company type: Subsidiary
- Industry: Manufacturing
- Predecessor: George H. Scott Machine Co., Scott & Fetzer Machine Co., Scott & Fetzer Co.
- Founded: 1914
- Founder: George H. Scott and Carl S. Fetzer
- Headquarters: Westlake, Ohio, United States
- Area served: Worldwide
- Key people: Kenneth Semelsberger (Chairman); Robert McBride (President and CEO); Vince Nardy (COO); Ralph Schey (CEO); Niles Hammink (Chairman of the Board)
- Revenue: Over $500 million (2020)
- Number of employees: 2,159 (2019)
- Parent: Berkshire Hathaway
- Subsidiaries: Meriam Process Technologies, Scottcare Corporation, Northland Motor Technologies, Scott Laboratories, Wayne Combustion Systems, CWP Technologies, SFEG, Arbortech, SFZ International, United Consumer Financial Services
- Website: scottfetzer.com

The Scott Fetzer Company, a subsidiary of Berkshire Hathaway, is an American diversified manufacturer and marketer of products for the home, family, and industry comprising 33 brands, headquartered in Westlake, Ohio.

The company was founded by George H. Scott and Carl S. Fetzer in 1914 as a machine shop under the name George H. Scott Machine Co.; the name changed to Scott & Fetzer Machine Co. in 1917 and again in 1919 to Scott & Fetzer Co. In early 1986, Berkshire Hathaway acquired the company for about $400 million.

Through its various brands, the company offers home cleaning systems, air compressors, paint sprayers, generators, pressure washers, educational products, electric motors, commercial truck and forestry equipment, cleaning products, patient monitoring equipment, and knives.

== History ==
The Scott Fetzer Company was founded in Cleveland, Ohio, by George H. Scott and Carl S. Fetzer. It began in a small machine shop as the George H. Scott Machine Co. in 1914 at 118 Noble Ct. It incorporated as the Scott & Fetzer Machine Co. on November 30, 1917, and moved to a bigger facility near Edgewater at Franklin Avenue and 114th St. In 1918, it shortened its name to Scott & Fetzer Co. In 1922, it began manufacturing and selling Kirby vacuum cleaners, invented by James Kirby. As the company grew steadily into the 1950s, its Kirby brand remained its mainstay product, with over 4,000 door-to-door sales people marketing the product in 1956.

By the 1960s, the company diversified by acquiring companies including PLM Products, the Adalet Co., the Halex Die Casting Co., and the Cleveland Wood Products Co.

In 1964, Quikut, a manufacturer of cutlery and plastics of Fremont, Ohio, was purchased, and began a core group to produce plastic injection molded components for other Scott Fetzer divisions, mainly The Kirby Company and Wayne Home Equipment. In 1971, it acquired ScotLabs, a carpeting and floor care company, founded in 1962 in Chagrin Falls, Ohio. It also acquired Campbell Hausfeld that same year.

On November 30, 1976, Niles Hammink retired as chief executive officer, completing 30 years of service to Scott & Fetzer. In September 1946, when Niles joined the company as treasurer, it was a one-product line company with sales of $1.7 million. He became president in 1968 and chief executive officer in 1970. Under his leadership, the company achieved its greatest growth, becoming an multi-market company with 31 operating divisions, 50 plants located in 14 states and in Canada, 7,500 employees, and sales of $343 million. In 1964, Scott & Fetzer made the decision to expand its single product into a multiple product company and Niles became the architect of the acquisition program, personally identifying and negotiating most of the transactions. His management philosophy emphasizing decentralized operations and division autonomy together with his humanistic approach in dealing with people contributed greatly to the smooth integration and assimilation of the many different organizations that became part of Scott & Fetzer.

In 1978, it bought World Book-Childcraft Intl. Co., from Field Enterprises, for $50 million boosting sales to $697 million a year later. In 1978, the plastic portion of Quikut was spun off into a new company, Western Enterprises.

During its time as an independent enterprise, the company was recognized for its consistently high record of return on equity in financial analysis reports; in 1984, it had sales of $695 million and a net income of $40.6 million from 12 subsidiaries, operating 42 plants that employed more than 16,000 people in the U.S. and Canada. In 1986, it was acquired by Berkshire Hathaway, a multinational conglomerate holding company headquartered in Omaha, Nebraska. In the same year it acquired American Angler, manufacturer of fishing fillet knives and accessories. In 1989, Western Enterprises became Western Plastics to focus on manufacturing for the Kirby brand.

From 1986 to 2002, which is the last year Berkshire reported its Scott Fetzer division's income separately, the company had an average net income of $51.1 million.

In 2006, its ReadiVac hand held, battery-powered vacuum brand was launched.

In 2010, Scott Fetzer Company combined three businesses: France Power Solutions, Northland Motor Technology, and Kingston Products to form Scott Fetzer Electric Group, known as SFEG, precision manufacturer of electric motors, power supplies, and transformers, located on the outskirts of Nashville in Fairview, Tennessee.

In 2015, Campbell Hausfeld was sold to Marmon Group, another subsidiary of Berkshire Hathaway, that operates more than 125 autonomous manufacturing and service businesses in 11 sectors including crane, electrical, food service, industrial, medical, metal, plumbing & refrigeration, transportation, and water technologies.

In 2017, Douglas Quikut, manufacturer of the Ginsu knives, was rebranded as Ginsu to "refresh the brand." In 2018, Scott Fetzer sold Scot Labs to State Industrial Products of Mayfield Heights, Ohio.

In 2021, Berkshire Hathaway sold Kirby to the Chicago, Illinois, based Right Lane Industries, ending its nearly century long history with Scott Fetzer.

Marmon took over Scott Fetzer in 2024.

== Organization ==
Many of Scott Fetzer's companies manufacture products for other companies within the brand portfolio. Operating under the Scott Fetzer Floorcare Group (SFFG), a number of the company's brands manufacturer components for its Kirby vacuums. These brands include CWP Technologies (previously Cleveland Wood Products), Western Plastics, Western Enterprises, and ReadiVac. Scott Fetzer Electric Group consists of France Power Solutions, Northland Motor Technology, and Kingston Products. To better focus on providing consumer goods for end user's home needs, Scott Fetzer Consumer Brands (SFCB) was formed. SFCB's brands include Wayne Pumps, Blue Angel Pumps, Halex, Ginsu Brands, and American Angler.

== Brands ==
- Adalet
- Altaquip
- American Angler
- Ambucor
- Arbortech
- Blue Angle Pumps
- Carefree
- Cleanovation
- CWP Technologies
- France Lighting Solutions
- Ginsu
- Kingston Manufacturing
- Northland Motor Technologies
- Meriam
- Powerex
- ReadiVac
- ScottCare Cardiovascular Solutions
- Scott Fetzer Consumer Brands (Kirby was sold in 2021 to Rightway Industrial Holding Co.)
- SFEG
- Scott Fetzer Floorcare Group
- Sol-Lux (by Carefree)
- STAHL
- Wayne Water Bug
- Wayne Combustion Systems
- Wayne Water Systems
- Western Enterprises
- Western Plastics
- World Book
- World Book Childcraft
- World of Wisdom (WOW)
