= Pampered Chef =

American multi-level marketing company

- Type: Subsidiary
- Industry: Kitchen and Food products
- Founded: 1980; 46 years ago River Forest, IL
- Headquarters: Addison Township, DuPage County, Illinois, United States
- Area served: United States, Canada, Germany, Austria, France
- Key people: Nevena Srebreva (CEO); Doris Christopher (chairman & founder)
- Products: Kitchen tools; stoneware; cookware; bakeware; cutlery; food products; cookbooks
- Owner: Berkshire Hathaway
- Website: www.pamperedchef.com

Pampered Chef is a multinational multi-level marketing company that offers a line of kitchen tools, food products, and cookbooks for preparing food in the home.

It has a worldwide direct sales force of about 35,000 in addition to 400 corporate staff. The company is headquartered in Addison, Illinois, and operates in five countries: the United States, Germany, Canada, Austria, and France.

== History ==
Doris Christopher founded Pampered Chef in 1980 in the basement of her suburban Chicago home. Christopher came up with a party plan to offer kitchen tools directly to consumers through in-home cooking demonstrations, a concept first popularized by Tupperware. The company expanded to Canada in 1996, the UK in 1999, Germany in 2000, Austria in 2019, and France in 2020.

The company was acquired in 2002 by Warren Buffett's Berkshire Hathaway corporation. On October 30, 2014, Berkshire Hathaway appointed long time advisor Tracy Britt Cool to the position of CEO. According to Direct Selling News, "the company's revenue has fallen from $320 million in 2015 to $280 million in 2018." In March 2020, the company's COO, Andrew Treanor, took over on the role of CEO. Nevena Srebreva, in turn, took over the CEO role in May 2024. She was Pampered Chef's Chief Field & International Officer prior to that.

The company closed its UK business, and wound down UK operations as of December 31, 2015.

== Products ==
In 1990, Pampered Chef released a product known as the Valtrompia bread tube. The product is a metal tube in which refrigerated bread dough can be baked into a narrow, scalloped-edge loaf. As of the late 1990s, the product is available in five shapes—flower, square, heart, scalloped, and star. The bread is baked with the tube placed upright in the oven, allowing the bread to rise vertically along the tube.

There have multiple recalls in Pampered Chef's history. For example, in March 2013, Pampered Chef recalled approximately 286,000 garlic slicers after reports that the slicer's blade could unexpectedly dislodge, posing a laceration hazard to consumers. In December 2011, the company recalled metallic gray aluminum ice cream scoops after incidents where the handle's end caps could blow off when exposed to warm water, resulting in injuries.

== Lawsuit ==
In April 2023, Pampered Chef was sued for alleged data sharing and sharing video viewing history from people visiting the company website with Google and Facebook. In June 2023, Pampered Chef settled the lawsuit claiming they did share video viewing history of users.
