= McLane Company =

American wholesale supply chain services company

McLane Company, Inc.
- Type: Subsidiary
- Industry: Logistics and Supply chain
- Founded: 1894; 132 years ago in Cameron, Texas
- Headquarters: Temple, Texas, United States
- Revenue: US$50 billion (2017)
- Owner: Berkshire Hathaway
- Number of employees: 20,545
- Subsidiaries: MBM, Transco
- Website: www.mclaneco.com

McLane Company, Inc. is an American wholesale supply chain services company that distributes products to convenience stores, discount retailers, wholesale clubs, drug stores, military bases, fast-food restaurants, and casual dining restaurants throughout the United States. It is also a wholesale distributor of distilled beverages in some parts of the country.

McLane is organized into three distribution segments: grocery, food service, and beverage (servicing retail locations in the Southeastern United States and Colorado).

Walmart, McLane's former parent company, is its largest client, making up approximately 25% of its 2017 revenues.

McLane was founded in 1894 in Cameron, Texas. The company is headquartered in Temple, and operates 80 grocery and food service distribution centers across the United States, as well as one in Brazil. McLane has been a wholly owned subsidiary of Berkshire Hathaway since 2003.

== History ==
In 1894, Robert McLane opened a small retail grocery store in downtown Cameron, Texas. In 1903, he expanded into wholesale trade, supplying grocery stores in neighboring towns via rail and horse-drawn wagons. During the 1920s through to the 1940s, his business grew to encompass much of the Central Texas region.

In 1966, McLane Company moved its operations to Temple, Texas, and began tailoring its warehouse operations and distribution methods to the retail market, including the growing convenience store market.

In 1976 under the leadership of Drayton McLane, Jr., the company began expanding beyond Texas. By 1990, the company had established a national presence.

In December 1990, Drayton McLane sold McLane Company to Wal-Mart Stores, Inc. for 10.4 million shares of Wal-Mart stock and an undisclosed amount of cash.

McLane Company entered the foodservice business in December 2000, when it acquired certain assets from AmeriServe Food Distribution to create McLane Foodservice.

In May 2003, Berkshire Hathaway acquired McLane Company from Wal-Mart for $1.45 billion.

In 2012, McLane acquired Meadowbrook Meat Company (MBM), a foodservice distributor.

== Customers ==
Retail chains that receive products from McLane include Walmart, Sam's Club, Walgreens, Pilot Flying J, Wawa, ExxonMobil, Target, Family Dollar, and AAFES.

Restaurant chains supplied by McLane Foodservice are part of the Yum! Brands corporation: Taco Bell, KFC, and Pizza Hut. They also provide food to Sonic Drive-In as of August 2010, Buffalo Wild Wings, Arby's, Del Taco, Denny's, Jack in the Box, Hardee's, Applebee's and El Pollo Loco

== Specialty divisions and companies ==
McLane Company owns the following specialty divisions and subsidiary companies:

- McLane Foodservice, Inc. is a supplier of food and foodservice items to restaurants throughout the US.
- Salado Sales develops and markets private label products to McLane's convenience stores. Its lines include health and beauty care items, film and flash products, light bulbs, motor oil, and work gloves.
- C.D. Hartnett, Inc. is a grocery wholesaler based in Weatherford, Texas. C.D. Hartnett supplies food service accounts, convenience stores, and independent grocers in Texas, Kansas, Oklahoma, and Louisiana. McLane Company acquired C.D. Hartnett in 2004.
- McCarty-Hull, Inc. is a grocery wholesaler based in Amarillo, Texas. McLane acquired McCarty-Hull in 2006.
- Empire Distributors is a wholesale alcoholic beverage distributor in the Southeast US. In 2010, McLane Company purchased Empire.
- MBM Foodservice, Rocky Mount, NC.
