= Garanimals =

American line of children's clothing

Garan Incorporated
- Company type: Subsidiary
- Founded: 1972; 53 years ago
- Founder: Seymour Lichtenstein
- Headquarters: United States
- Parent: Berkshire Hathaway
- Website: www.garanimals.com

Garanimals is an American brand of children's related clothing separates, created by Seymour Lichtenstein in 1972 for Garan Incorporated. Each item of clothing features a hang-tag depicting one of several animal characters called Garanimals.

The original clothing had small embroidered animals on the breast or bottom of tops, and on the waistband of bottoms (or sometimes on one leg above the hem for shorts.) Their second ever coordinator was Gary Sears.

The intent was to allow children to pick out their own outfits by matching the same animal to a top and a bottom (the line was coordinated so that matching sets would be complementary but provide a choice of combinations.)

In February 2008 the brand was relaunched in the US, and is sold exclusively by Walmart, in its stores and online. Garan is currently owned by Berkshire Hathaway, which also owns Fruit of the Loom.
