= Helzberg Diamonds =

American jewelry retailer

- A Helzberg Diamonds shop in Knoxville, Tennessee
- Type: Subsidiary
- Industry: Retail
- Founded: 1915; 111 years ago, in Kansas City, Kansas, U.S.
- Founder: Morris Helzberg
- Headquarters: North Kansas City, Missouri, U.S.
- Number of locations: 200+ stores (2017)
- Area served: United States
- Key people: Brad Hampton (CEO)
- Products: Jewelry
- Parent: Berkshire Hathaway
- Website: www.helzberg.com

Helzberg Diamonds is a jewelry retailer founded in 1915 by Morris Helzberg that has 210 stores in 36 US states.

== History ==
Soon after Helzberg's founding, Morris Helzberg became ill and the company was taken over by his son, Barnett Helzberg Sr., at the age of 14. In 1963, Barnett Sr. became Chairman of the Board and his son, Barnett Helzberg Jr., took over company operations. Barnett replaced his father in the Chairman position in 1988. Barnett Jr. sold the company to Berkshire Hathaway, owned by Warren Buffett, in 1995, and authored the book What I Learned Before I Sold to Warren Buffett.

In 2017, Helzberg closed several stores, though customers who purchased Lifetime Care warranties are still able to utilize other stores for regular cleanings and inspections, or mail the jewelry to the company's service center.

In 2024, the company shortened its commercial brand name from Helzberg Diamonds to simply Helzberg, emphasizing that the company does not only sell diamond-related products.

== Governance ==
- 2009-2022: Beryl Raff
- Since 2022: Brad Hampton

== Sponsorship ==
In 2023, Helzberg became the Official Jeweler of the Kansas City Current women soccer team.
