= Star Furniture =

U.S. retailer

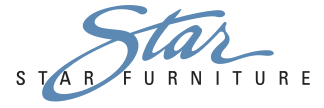
- Company type: Subsidiary
- Industry: Retail
- Founded: 1912; 114 years ago in Houston, Texas, United States
- Headquarters: Houston, Texas, United States
- Key people: Richard Jones (President)
- Products: Furniture
- Owner: Berkshire Hathaway
- Website: www.starfurniture.com

Star Furniture is an American home furnishing store headquartered in Houston, Texas that sells furniture, rugs, mattresses, draperies and accessories. Star Furniture is the oldest operating furniture store in Texas and celebrated its 110th year in business in 2022. Star Furniture is a wholly owned subsidiary of Berkshire Hathaway.

== History ==
Star was founded in 1912 by three men who pooled their resources to buy a horse and buggy to deliver furniture in Houston, Texas.

Russian immigrant Boris Wolff bought a ¼ interest in the store in 1924, and by 1950, Star had six stores. Boris passed the company on to his two children Melvyn Wolff and Shirley Wolff Toomim. Melvyn Wolff became president of the company in 1962 and in 1997, the Wolff's decided to sell the company to aid its growth. Melvyn Wolff retired, and Warren Buffett purchased the company, which is now a Berkshire Hathaway subsidiary. Wolff remained chairman of the board until his death in 2017; Shirley Toomim is Vice Chairman.

Star Furniture has eleven stores – six in Greater Houston and one each in San Antonio, Austin and Bryan; as well as two clearance stores located in Houston. Some of the brand names Star carries include Natuzzi, Thomasville, Kincaid, Bernhardt, Hooker and Serta.

== Community involvement ==
Star Furniture has instituted the Red Apple Award, which provides a prize of classroom furniture to an outstanding teacher each year. The company also participates in the Season For Caring program and Habitat for Humanity.
