= Berkshire Hathaway =

American multinational conglomerate holding company

Berkshire Hathaway Inc.

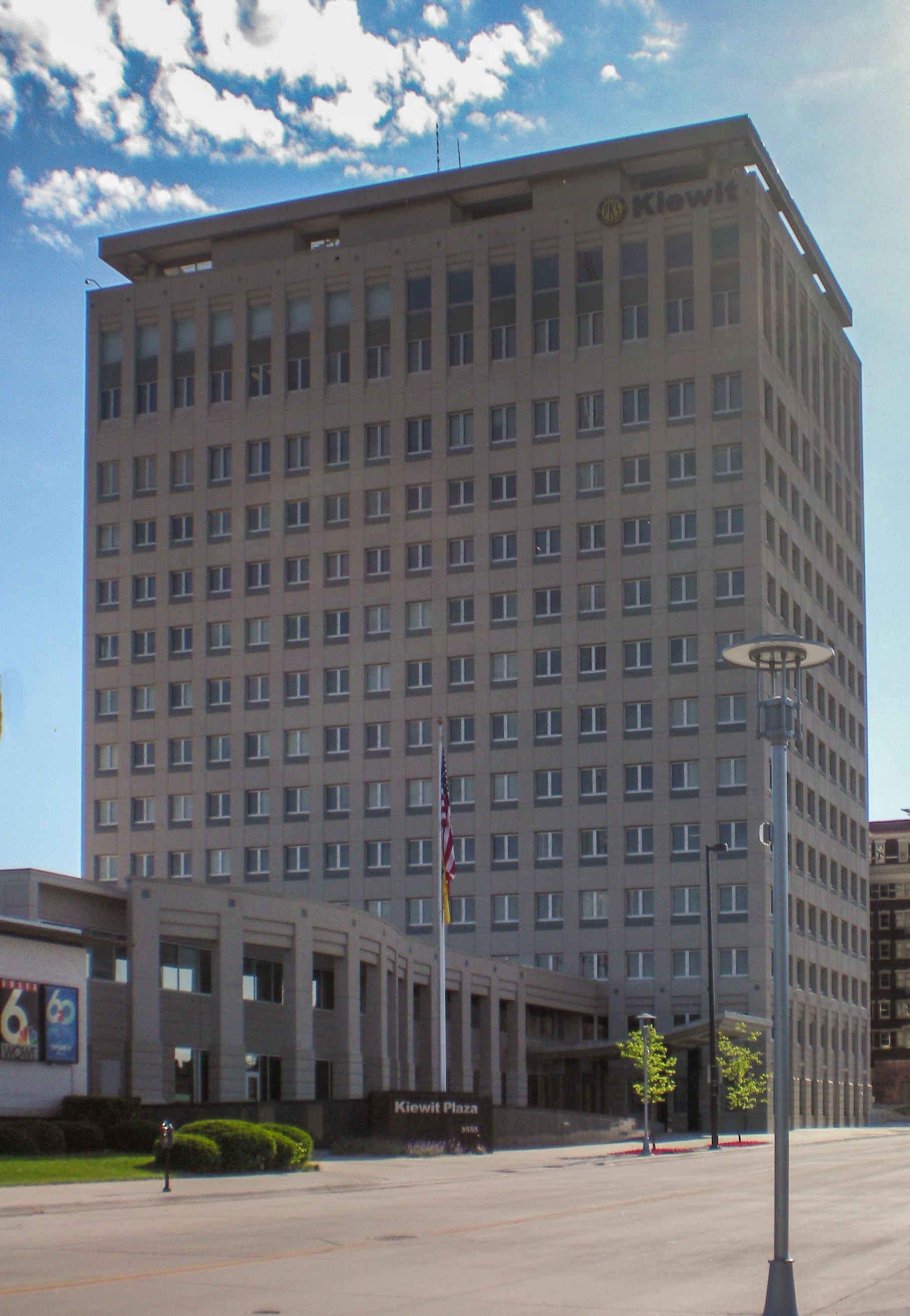
- Blackstone Plaza, the location of Berkshire's corporate offices in Omaha, Nebraska
- Type: Public
- Traded as: NYSE: BRK.A (Class A); NYSE: BRK.B (Class B); S&P 100 component (BRK.B); S&P 500 component (BRK.B)
- ISIN: US0846707026
- Industry: Conglomerate
- Predecessor: Valley Falls Company (1839–1929); Berkshire Fine Spinning Associates (1929–1955); Hathaway Manufacturing Company (1888–1955)
- Founded: 1839; 187 years ago (as Valley Falls Company); 1955; 71 years ago (as Berkshire Hathaway)
- Founder: Oliver Chace
- Headquarters: Blackstone Plaza, Omaha, Nebraska, US
- Area served: Worldwide
- Key people: Howard Graham Buffett (chairman); Warren Buffett (chairman emeritus); Greg Abel (president & CEO); Ajit Jain (vice chairman, Insurance)
- Products: List: Property & casualty insurance; Reinsurance; Rail transport; Electric power; Natural gas; Real estate services; Industrial parts & materials; Mobile homes; Building materials; Recreational vehicles; Apparel; Retail stores & services; Aviation services
- Revenue: ▲US$371.4 billion (2025)
- Operating income: ▼US$92.05 billion (2025)
- Net income: ▼US$66.97 billion (2025)
- Total assets: ▲US$1.222 trillion (2025)
- Total equity: ▲US$717.4 billion (2025)
- Owner: Warren Buffett (14.3%) (Note: Warren Buffett is the single largest shareholder, controlling 30.3% of the voting power and approximately 14.3% of the economic interest in the company.)
- Number of employees: 387,800 (2025)
- Subsidiaries: See List of subsidiaries
- Website: www.berkshirehathaway.com

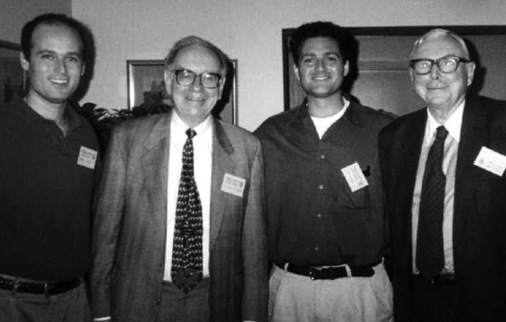
Buffett (second from left) and Munger (at right) in 1998

Berkshire Hathaway Inc. (/ˈbɜːrkʃər/) is an American multinational conglomerate holding company headquartered in Omaha, Nebraska. Originally a textile manufacturer, the company transitioned into a conglomerate starting in 1965 under the management of chairman and CEO Warren Buffett (from 1970 to 2025) and vice chairman Charlie Munger (from 1978 to 2023). Greg Abel succeeded Buffett as CEO at the beginning of 2026. Buffett personally owns 38.4% of the Class A voting shares of Berkshire Hathaway, representing a 15.1% overall economic interest in the company.

The company is often compared to an investment fund; in the sixty years between 1965, when Buffett gained control of the company, and 2025, the company's shareholder returns amounted to a compound annual growth rate (CAGR) of 19.7% compared to a 10.5% CAGR for the S&P 500. From 1965 to 2025, the stock price had negative performance in only eleven years. In August 2024, Berkshire Hathaway became the eighth largest U.S. public company and the first non-technology company to be valued at over $1 trillion.

Berkshire Hathaway is ranked 5th on the Fortune 500 and 9th on the Fortune Global 500. In surveys taken in the 2000s and 2010s by Barron's, Berkshire was named among the "Most Respected" companies by professional investors. Berkshire is one of the ten largest components of the S&P 500 and is on the list of largest employers in the United States. Its class A shares have the highest per-share price of any public company in the world, reaching $700,000 in August 2024, because the board of directors has historically been opposed to stock splits.

== History ==
Berkshire Hathaway originated as a textile manufacturer formed in 1955 from the merger of Hathaway Manufacturing Company and Berkshire Fine Spinning Associates. Berkshire Associates took its name from Berkshire County, Massachusetts, where it was based, and Hathaway Manufacturing was named for its founder, Horatio Hathaway. After the merger, Berkshire Hathaway had 15 plants employing over 12,000 workers with over $120 million in revenue, and was headquartered in New Bedford. However, seven of those locations were closed by the end of the 1950s, accompanied by large layoffs.

In 1962, Warren Buffett began buying Berkshire Hathaway stock for his investment fund, Buffett Partnership Ltd., at $7.50 per share, anticipating that as the company liquidated textile mills there would come a tender offer when he could sell the shares at a profit. A year later, Buffett's fund owned 7% of the company. In 1964, Buffett offered to sell his shares back to the company for $11.50 each. Seabury Stanton, the manager of Berkshire Hathaway, told Buffett orally that he had a deal. A few weeks later, Warren Buffett received the tender offer in writing, but the tender offer was for only $11.375 per share. Buffett later admitted that this lower, undercutting offer made him angry. Instead of selling at the slightly lower price, Buffett bought more of the stock at an even higher price to take control of the company and fire Stanton; Stanton and his son resigned in 1965. However, this left Buffett's fund with a major interest in a declining textile business.

Buffett has described buying the Berkshire Hathaway textile company as the biggest investment mistake he had ever made, denying him compounded investment returns of about $200 billion over the subsequent 45 years. He has estimated that had he invested the same money directly in insurance businesses instead of indirectly via Berkshire Hathaway (due to what he perceived as a slight by an individual), it would have paid off several hundredfold. In 1985, the company's last textile operations were shut down.

Also in 1962, Warren Buffett set up his office in Omaha, Nebraska, at the current Berkshire Hathaway headquarters located at Blackstone Plaza (formerly named Kiewit Plaza). As of the end of 2024, the company had only 27 employees at that corporate headquarters. In 1963, Franklin Otis Booth Jr. invested $1 million in the company (equivalent to $10,500,000 in 2025), and in 1968 David Gottesman also invested in the company. The investments eventually made both men billionaires.

=== Acquisitions ===
==== Buffet Era ====
In March 1967, Berkshire acquired National Indemnity Company, based in Omaha, Nebraska, for $8.6 million in the first acquisition by the company under Buffett's control and the company's entrance into the insurance business. National Indemnity was founded in 1940 by Jack Dabney Ringwalt. In 2012, National Indemnity acquired workers' compensation insurer GUARD for $221 million.

Berkshire acquired See's Candies in 1972 for $25 million. It produces boxed chocolates and other confectionery products in two large kitchens in California. See's revenues are highly seasonal, with approximately 50% of total annual revenue earned in the months of November and December. By 2019, the $25 million investment had returned over $2 billion, or an 8000% return, to Berkshire.

In 1976, Berkshire first invested in GEICO, at a time when it was facing financial difficulty and had a very low stock price.

In 1977, Berkshire bought the Buffalo Evening News and resumed publication of a Sunday edition of the paper that had ceased in 1914. After the morning newspaper Buffalo Courier-Express ceased operation in 1982, the Buffalo Evening News changed its name to The Buffalo News and began to print morning and evening editions. It now prints only a morning edition. Berkshire formed BH Media Group with a purchase of the Omaha World-Herald in December 2011, which included six other daily newspapers and several weeklies across Nebraska and southwest Iowa. In June 2012, Berkshire bought 63 newspapers from Media General, including the Richmond Times-Dispatch and Winston-Salem Journal, for $142 million in cash. In 2012, Berkshire Hathaway bought Texas dailies The Bryan-College Station Eagle and the Waco Tribune-Herald. In 2013, the company bought the Tulsa World, the Greensboro, North Carolina-based News & Record, Virginia's Roanoke Times, and Press of Atlantic City. In 2014, Graham Holdings Company sold its Miami television station, ABC affiliate WPLG to BH Media in a cash and stock deal. In June 2018, Lee Enterprises and Berkshire Hathaway reached a five-year agreement to allow Lee Enterprises to manage Berkshire Hathaway's newspaper and digital operations. In 2020, Lee Enterprises acquired BH Media Group's publications and The Buffalo News for $140 million in cash, retaining WPLG, which later ended its ABC affiliation and became an independent station in August 2025. In conjunction with the sale, Berkshire lent $576 million to Lee.

In 1983, Berkshire acquired Nebraska Furniture Mart for $60 million. In 2000, Nebraska Furniture Mart bought Homemakers Furniture.

In 1986, Berkshire acquired Scott Fetzer Company, a diversified group of 32 brands that manufactures and distributes products for residential, industrial, and institutional use, including Ginsu knives and World Book Encyclopedia. It included Kirby Company, which was sold in 2021, Wayne Water Systems, and Campbell Hausfeld products. Campbell Hausfeld was transferred to Marmon, also a Berkshire subsidiary, in 2015.

In January 1986, Berkshire acquired Fechheimer Brothers, owner of Flying Cross, which manufactures public safety uniforms, and Vertx, a civilian tactical clothing company.

In 1991, Berkshire acquired H.H. Brown Shoe Group.

In May 1995, Berkshire acquired RC Willey Home Furnishings. In June 1997, Berkshire acquired Star Furniture.

In January 1996, Berkshire acquired full ownership of GEICO, acquiring the 49% of the company that it did not then own for $2.3 billion. GEICO, headquartered in Chevy Chase, Maryland, primarily offers private passenger automobile insurance marketed directly to individual consumers in the United States. The company is known for its advertising characters including a gecko and the GEICO Cavemen.

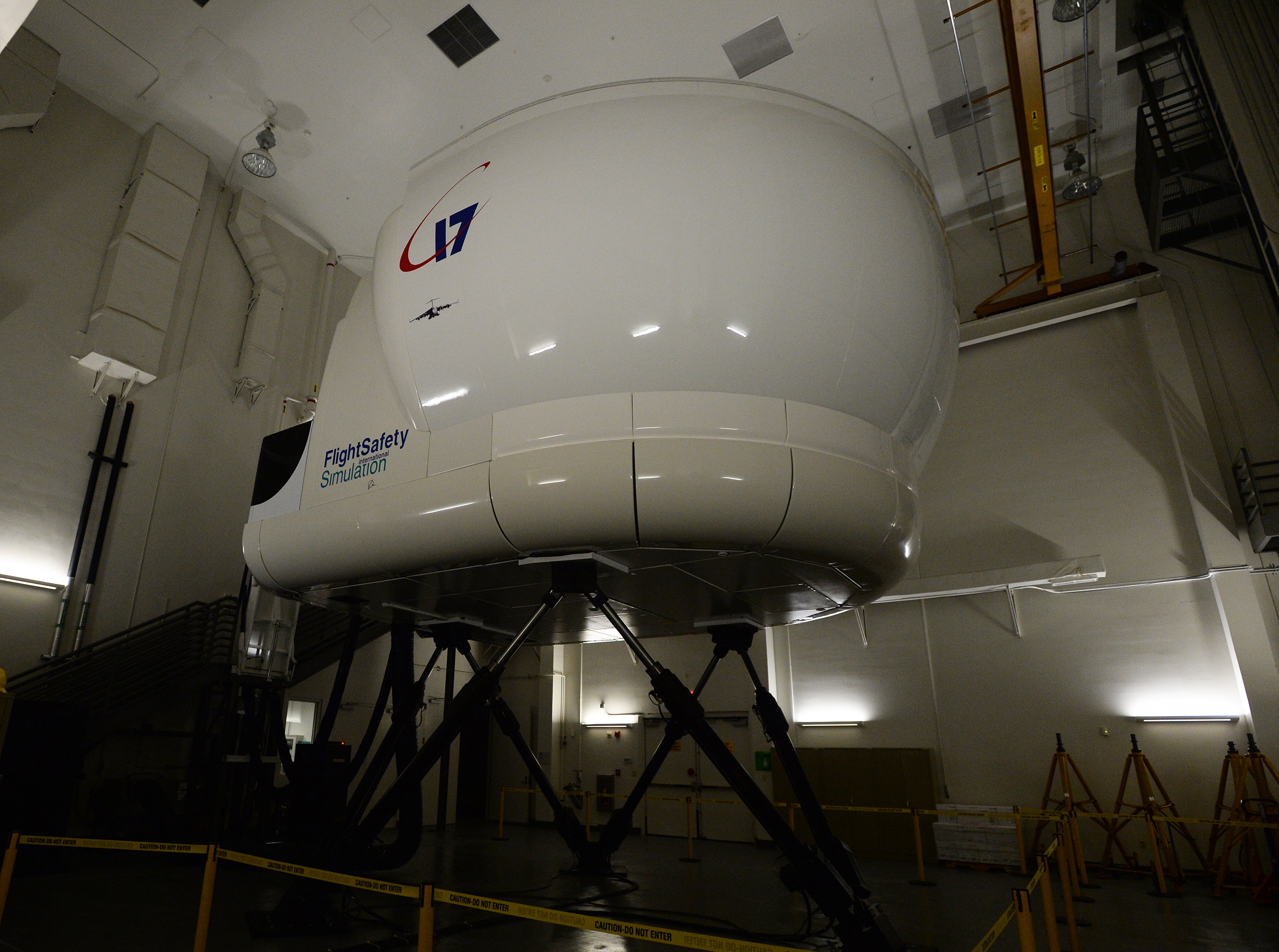
C-17 Globemaster III full flight simulator at Joint Base Pearl Harbor–Hickam

In February 1997, Berkshire acquired FlightSafety International (FSI), a pilot training company founded in 1951 by Albert Lee Ueltschi and headquartered at LaGuardia Airport in Flushing, New York. It uses flight simulators and is the largest provider of professional aviation training services.

In October 1997, Berkshire acquired Dairy Queen, based in Edina, Minnesota, for $585 million. It franchises approximately 6,000 stores operating under the names Dairy Queen, Orange Julius, and Karmelkorn that sell dairy desserts, beverages, prepared foods, blended fruit drinks, popcorn, and other snack foods.

In July 1998, Berkshire Hathaway acquired NetJets, formerly Executive Jet Aviation, for $725 million in cash. NetJets is the world's largest provider of fractional ownership programs for general aviation aircraft. In 1986, NetJets created the fractional ownership of aircraft concept and introduced its NetJets program in the United States with one aircraft type. In 2019, the NetJets program operated more than 10 aircraft types with a fleet size of greater than 750.

In December 1998, Berkshire acquired Gen Re, headquartered in Stamford, Connecticut, for $22 billion. Berkshire paid for the acquisition with Class A shares valued at $58,400 each; Buffett later said he overpaid, despite strong performance by General Re.

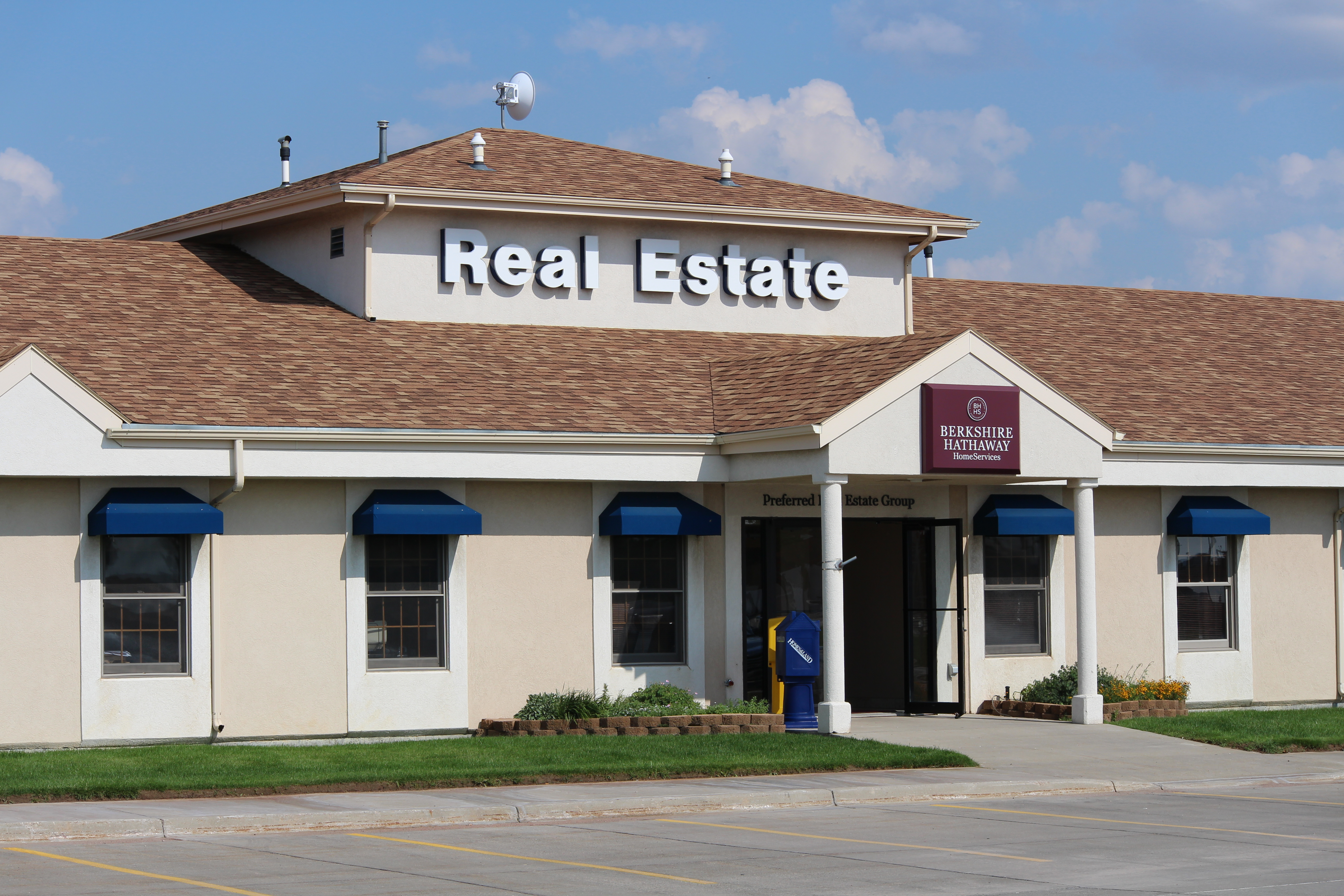
A HomeServices of America in Gillette, Wyoming

In 1999, Berkshire acquired MidAmerican Energy Holdings. At the time of purchase, Berkshire's voting interest was limited to 10% of the company's shares, but this restriction ended when the Public Utility Holding Company Act of 1935 was repealed in 2005. It owns Northern Powergrid, which operates in the UK. In 2005, it acquired PacifiCorp for $5.1 billion in cash, and assumed $4.3 billion in PacificCorp debt and preferred stock. MidAmerican was rebranded as Berkshire Hathaway Energy (BHE) in April 2014. The division owns a residential real estate brokerage business, which, in March 2013, was rebranded as HomeServices of America, a division of Berkshire Hathaway Energy. In addition to brokerage services, it provides mortgage loan originations, title insurance and closing services, home warranty, property insurance and casualty insurance and other related services. The company has acquired several residential real estate brokerages including Long & Foster, acquired in September 2017.

In October 1999, Berkshire acquired Jordan's Furniture for an estimated $200 million to $300 million.

CORT Business Services Corporation was acquired in February 2000 by Wesco Financial Corporation, an 80.1% owned subsidiary of Berkshire and is the largest US provider of rental furniture, accessories and related services in the "rent-to-rent" segment of the furniture rental industry.

In May 2000, Berkshire acquired Ben Bridge Jeweler, a chain of jewelry stores established in 1912 with locations primarily in the western United States. Helzberg Diamonds, a chain of jewelry stores based in Kansas City that began in 1915, was acquired by Berkshire in 1995 after a chance run in between Buffett and Barnett Helzberg on a street in New York City.

In June 2000, the company acquired Justin Brands, the parent company of Justin Boots, Acme Boots, and Acme Brick for $600 million in cash. Headquartered in Fort Worth, Texas, Acme manufactures and distributes clay bricks (Acme Brick), concrete block (Featherlite), and cut limestone (Texas Quarries). Justin Brands also owns Chippewa Boots, Nocona Boots, and Tony Lama Boots.

In December 2000, Berkshire acquired Benjamin Moore & Co., headquartered in Montvale, New Jersey. Moore formulates, manufactures, and sells architectural coatings that are available primarily in the United States and Canada. Buffett agreed not to sell the products through major retail chains.

In January 2001, Berkshire acquired 87% of Dalton, Georgia-based Shaw Industries. It acquired the remaining 12% in January 2002. Shaw is the world's largest carpet manufacturer based on both revenue and volume of production and designs and manufactures over 3,000 styles of tufted and woven carpet and laminate flooring for residential and commercial use under approximately 30 brand and trade names and under certain private labels.

In February 2001, Berkshire acquired Johns Manville, established in 1858 and a manufacturer of fiberglass wool insulation products for homes and commercial buildings, as well as pipe, duct, and equipment insulation products.

In July 2001, Berkshire acquired a 90% equity interest in MiTek, headquartered in Chesterfield, Missouri, which makes engineered connector products, engineering software and services, and manufacturing machinery for the truss fabrication segment of the building components industry. In May 2008, Mitek acquired Hohmann & Barnard, a fabricator of anchors and reinforcement systems for masonry. In October 2008, Mitek acquired Blok-Lok of Toronto, Canada. On April 23, 2010, Mitek acquired the assets of Dur-O-Wal from Dayton Superior.

In February 2002, Berkshire acquired Albecca, headquartered in Norcross, Georgia, operating under the Larson-Juhl name. Albecca designs, manufactures, and distributes custom framing products, including wood and metal molding, matboard, foamboard, glass, equipment, and other framing supplies.

In April 2002, Berkshire acquired Fruit of the Loom for $835 million in cash. It acquired Russell Corporation in August 2006, for $600 million. Fruit of the Loom also acquired Brooks Sports in 2006.

In September 2002, Berkshire acquired Garanimals for $273 million.

In October 2002, Berkshire acquired The Pampered Chef, the largest direct seller of kitchen tools in the United States. Products are researched, designed, and tested by The Pampered Chef, and manufactured by third-party suppliers. From its headquarters in Addison, Illinois, The Pampered Chef utilizes a network of more than 65,000 independent sales representatives to sell its products through home-based party demonstrations, principally in the United States.

Also in October 2002, Berkshire also acquired CTB International. CTB, headquartered in Milford, Indiana, is a designer, manufacturer, and marketer of systems used in the grain industry and in the production of poultry, hogs, and eggs. Products are produced in the United States and Europe and are sold primarily through a global network of independent dealers and distributors, with peak sales occurring in the second and third quarters.

In May 2003, Berkshire acquired McLane Company from Walmart. The company later acquired Professional Datasolutions and Salado Sales. McLane provides wholesale distribution and logistics services in all 50 states and internationally in Brazil to customers that include discount retailers, convenience stores, quick-service restaurants, drug stores and movie theater complexes.

In August 2003, Berkshire Hathaway acquired Clayton Homes, a maker of manufactured housing, modular homes, storage trailers, chassis, intermodal piggyback trailers and domestic containers, headquartered near Knoxville, Tennessee, for $1.7 billion.

In July 2005, Berkshire Hathaway acquired Forest River, the world's largest seller of recreational vehicles, from Pete Liegl for $800 million.

In 2005, Berkshire acquired Applied Underwriters. In 2019, Applied Underwriters was sold back to its founder for $920 million.

In January 2006, Berkshire bought Business Wire, a US press release agency.

In March 2007, Berkshire Hathaway acquired TTI, Inc. Headquartered in Fort Worth, Texas, TTI is the largest distributor specialist of passive, interconnect, and electromechanical components. TTI's extensive product line includes; resistors, capacitors, connectors, potentiometers, trimmers, magnetic and circuit protection components, wire and cable, identification products, application tools, and electromechanical devices.

In April 2007, Berkshire acquired 10.9% of BNSF Railway for $3.23 billion. In February 2010, the remaining portion that it did not already own was acquired for $26 billion. This was the largest acquisition to date in Berkshire's history.

NRG (Nederlandse Reassurantie Groep) was acquired by Berkshire from ING Group in December 2007.

Also in December 2007, when stresses that led to the 2008 financial crisis were forming, Berkshire created a government bond insurance company to insure municipal bonds, starting with New York State bonds.

In 2008, Berkshire Hathaway acquired 60% of Marmon Group, a conglomerate owned by the Pritzker family for over fifty years that owned and operated companies that produce railroad tank cars, shopping carts, plumbing pipes, metal fasteners, wiring and water treatment products used in residential construction. Berkshire acquired the remainder of Marmon in 2013.

In September 2011, Berkshire Hathaway acquired Lubrizol for $9 billion in cash.

In March 2011, Berkshire Hathaway made its first foray into the Indian insurance sector with its non-direct subsidiary BerkshireInsurance.com.

In 2012, Berkshire acquired Oriental Trading Company, a direct marketing company for novelty items, small toys, and party items for around $500 million.

On October 2, 2014, Berkshire Hathaway Automotive, an auto dealership subsidiary, was created through the acquisition of Van Tuyl Group, the largest auto dealer in the nation that was still independently owned up to that date. In 2016, it was the fifth-largest auto dealership group, with ownership of 81 dealerships and revenues of $8 billion.

In January 2016, Berkshire Hathaway acquired Precision Castparts Corp. for $32.1 billion. In 2020, Buffett said he overpaid for the company and wrote down its value by approximately $10 billion.

In February 2016, Berkshire Hathaway acquired Duracell from Procter & Gamble for $4.7 billion in stock in P&G previously owned by Berkshire Hathaway.

In 2017, Berkshire acquired 38.6% of truck stop chain Pilot Flying J for $2.8 billion, followed by the acquisition of an additional 41.4% of the company for $8.2 billion in 2023, and the remaining 20% in 2024 for $3 billion. It appointed two Berkshire Hathaway Energy executives as CEO and CFO of the company, retaining Jimmy Haslam as chairman.

In October 2022, Berkshire Hathaway acquired insurance company Alleghany Corporation for $11.6 billion. As part of the transaction, Berkshire reduced the purchase price of the company by any fees that it paid investment bankers. This move was touted as an example of Warren Buffett's "disdain" for investment bankers.

In January 2026, Berkshire acquired OxyChem from Occidental Petroleum for $9.7 billion in cash.

==== Greg Abel Era ====
Berkshire Hathaway agreed to buy home builder Taylor Morrison Home Corporation for $6.8 billion in cash in May 2026. The transaction is expected to close in the second half of 2026, after which Taylor Morrison will become a private company. The deal was the first major acquisition since Greg Abel succeeded Warren Buffett as CEO.

On June 1, 2026, Berkshire Hathaway agreed to invest $10 billion in Alphabet through a private placement.

=== Major stock purchases and sales ===
Buffett began investing in Wells Fargo in 1989; however, by the first quarter of 2022, Berkshire Hathaway had sold its entire interest in the company.

Buffett turned down an opportunity to invest in Amazon.com in 1994, as he was unable to predict the company's future growth and it was losing money. Berkshire Hathaway bought shares in Amazon in 2019, a position worth $2 billion at the time.

Berkshire made its first investment in Tesco in 2006, and in 2012 it raised this stake to over 5% of the company, investing a total of $2.3 billion. Buffett sold around 30% of this stake in 2013 when he "soured somewhat on the company's then-management", realizing a profit of $43 million. As Tesco's problems mounted through 2014, Berkshire sold all the remaining shares with Buffett saying to shareholders that the delay in selling shares was costly. Berkshire realized an after-tax loss of $444 million on the Tesco investment.

In early 2008, Berkshire increased its stake in ConocoPhillips to 85 million shares. Buffett later described this as "a major mistake" as the price of oil collapsed during the Great Recession. Berkshire sold most of its shares but held 472,000 shares until 2012. That year, ConocoPhillips completed the corporate spin-off of Phillips 66, of which Berkshire owned 27 million shares. Berkshire later sold $1.4 billion worth of shares to Phillips 66 in exchange for Phillips Specialty Products. Buffett frequently referred to Phillips 66 as one of the best businesses Berkshire invested in because of its consistent dividends and share repurchase programs. However, Berkshire sold its entire holdings in 2020.

In September 2008, at the peak of the 2008 financial crisis, Berkshire invested $5 billion in preferred stock in Goldman Sachs to provide it with a source of funding when capital markets had become constrained. The preferred stock yielded an annual interest rate of 10%, earning Berkshire $500 million in interest income per year. Berkshire also received warrants to buy 43.5 million shares with at $115 per share, which were exercisable at any time for a five-year term. Goldman had the right to re-purchase the preferred stock at a 10% premium, and in March 2011 exercised this right paying $5.5 billion to Berkshire. Profit on the preferred stock was estimated at $1.8 billion and exercising the warrants yielded a profit of more than $2 billion. Buffett defended Lloyd Blankfein's decisions as CEO of Goldman Sachs and his efforts to improve the reputation of the company during the 2008 financial crisis.

In September 2008, BHE invested about US$230 million for approximately a 10% share of BYD Auto. Some shares were sold in 2023 and 2024, with Buffett motivated by the China–United States trade war.

In October 2008, Berkshire invested $6.5 billion in Wrigley Company as part of a financing package to enable Mars Inc. to acquire the company. Berkshire sold its remaining bonds and preferred stock to Mars in 2016.

In early 2011, Berkshire first invested in IBM. The shares were entirely sold in 2018.

On August 26, 2011, Berkshire Hathaway bought $5 billion of preferred shares in Bank of America. The shares yielded 6%, earning Berkshire $300 million in annual interest. Alongside the preferred stock investment, Berkshire obtained warrants allowing Berkshire to buy 700 million common shares at $7.14 per share, which were exercised. By 2017, this position had yielded a profit of about $12 billion excluding the annual interest earned from the preferred stock.

In 2013, Berkshire and 3G Capital acquired H. J. Heinz Company for $28 billion including debt. In 2015, Heinz merged with Kraft Foods to form Kraft Heinz. In 2019, Buffett said that he overpaid in the deal.

In 2013, Berkshire owned 1.74 million shares of Gannett; however, it sold its shares in the second quarter of 2013.

In the first quarter of 2016, Berkshire began investing in Apple Inc., with a purchase of 9.8 million shares (0.2% of Apple) worth $1 billion. By the end of June 2016, this stake had increased to 15.2 million shares (0.3% of Apple). By December 31, 2016, Berkshire had built up a stake of 57.4 million shares (1.1% of Apple) with an estimated average acquisition price of $110 per share (before the 2020 4:1 split). Aggressive stock purchases continued and by March 31, 2017, Berkshire had amassed a stake of 129 million shares (2.5% of Apple). By December 31, 2017, Berkshire owned 166 million shares (3.3% of Apple). Berkshire bought 75 million more shares in early 2018. As of December 31, 2022, Berkshire owned 5.8% of Apple. Berkshire Hathaway reduced its Apple stake by nearly 50%, selling $75.5 billion worth of stock in the second quarter of 2024, increasing its cash reserves to a record $276.9 billion. Buffett had said that Apple has developed an ecosystem and level of brand loyalty that provides it with an economic moat, and that consumers appear to have a degree of price insensitivity when it comes to the iPhone. While Buffett generally does not invest in tech stocks, he has said that Apple is a consumer products company and that he understands consumer products businesses.

In the third quarter of 2016, Berkshire surprised investors by making large equity investments in the major US airlines. Buffett had previously described airlines as a "deathtrap for investors". Buffett had made an investment in US Airways in 1989 which, although he sold for a profit, almost lost Berkshire a substantial sum of money. In 2017, Berkshire was the largest shareholder in United Airlines and Delta Air Lines and a top 3 shareholder in Southwest Airlines and American Airlines. Buffett himself has described this as a "call on the industry" rather than a choice in an individual company. American Airlines' CEO Doug Parker is said to have won over Ted Weschler in arguing that the airline industry had consolidated sufficiently and rationalized supply such that longer-term profitability could be achieved in an industry that has historically been loss-making in aggregate. In April 2020, Berkshire sold all shares in the airlines due to the impact of the COVID-19 pandemic on commercial air transport.

In June 2017, Berkshire invested $377 million in Store Capital, a Scottsdale-based real estate investment trust that owned more than 1,750 properties in 48 states; the company was sold to private equity firms in 2022.

In June 2017, Berkshire acquired a 38.4% stake in Home Capital Group for $400 million, giving a lifeline to the Toronto-based embattled mortgage lender. The shares were sold in 2018.

In 2019, by buying warrants and preferred stock, Berkshire provided $10 billion in financing to Occidental Petroleum as part of its acquisition of Anadarko Petroleum. Berkshire began investing in common shares of Occidental beginning in 2022 and has increased its position since.

Between September 2019 and August 2020, Berkshire bought more than 5% of the outstanding stock of each of the five largest Japanese sogo shosha (Itochu, Mitsubishi, Mitsui, Sumitomo, and Marubeni) through its National Indemnity subsidiary. These stakes were worth a total of over $6 billion as of August 2020. By April 2023, Berkshire increased its stake in each of those companies to 7.4%. He continued to increase the stakes over time.

In the second quarter of 2020, Berkshire added a position of more than 20 million shares in Barrick Gold; the shares were sold in 2021. In the third quarter of 2020, the company agreed to buy Dominion Energy's natural gas transmission and storage operations.

In the first quarter of 2022, Berkshire acquired a $2.6 billion stake in Paramount Global. However, at an annual meeting on May 4, 2024, Buffett stated that he had sold all of his shares in Paramount at a substantial loss, blaming himself for deciding to invest.

In the first quarter of 2022, Berkshire acquired 121 million shares of HP Inc. valued at more than $4.2 billion; the shares were sold in 2023 and 2024.

In the third quarter of 2022, Berkshire bought 60 million shares in TSMC valued at $4.1 billion; the shares were sold in late 2022 and 2023 in part due to geopolitical tensions.

Berkshire began investing in Chubb Limited in 2023; by 2024, it owned a 6.4% stake worth $6.7 billion.

Berkshire Hathaway bought 5.62 million shares of Constellation Brands in the fourth quarter of 2024, worth $1.24 billion. The purchase made Berkshire Hathaway the sixth-largest shareholder of Constellation Brands.

Berkshire Hathaway sold its stake in Ulta Beauty in the fourth quarter of 2024, just two quarters after acquiring the shares.

In the fourth quarter of 2024, Berkshire Hathaway liquidated all of its ETF holdings in the S&P 500, worth a total of $44 million.

== Historical returns ==
A light green background means a better result in a given year.

year	Berkshire Hathaway [%]	S&P 500 Total Returns [%]
average	18.09	11.82
2025	10.85	17.88
2024	25.49	25.02
2023	15.77	26.29
2022	4.00	−18.11
2021	29.57	28.71
2020	2.42	18.40
2019	10.98	31.49
2018	2.82	−4.38
2017	21.91	21.83
2016	23.42	11.96
2015	−12.48	1.38
2014	27.04	13.69
2013	32.70	32.39
2012	16.82	16.00
2011	−4.73	2.11
2010	21.42	15.06
2009	2.69	26.46
2008	−31.78	−37.00
2007	28.74	5.49
2006	24.11	15.79
2005	0.82	4.91
2004	4.33	10.88
2003	15.81	28.68
2002	−3.77	−22.10
2001	6.48	−11.89
2000	26.56	−9.10
1999	−19.86	21.04
1998	52.17	28.58
1997	34.90	33.36
1996	6.23	22.96
1995	57.35	37.58
1994	24.96	1.32
1993	38.94	10.08
1992	29.83	7.62
1991	35.58	30.47
1990	−23.05	−3.10
1989	84.57	31.69
1988	59.32	16.61
1987	4.61	5.25
1986	14.17	18.67
1985	93.73	31.73
1984	−2.67	6.27
1983	69.03	22.56
1982	38.39	21.55
1981	31.76	−4.91

== Selected holdings ==
=== Subsidiaries ===
Business line	Companies
Insurance	biBerk Business Insurance; Berkshire Hathaway Assurance; Central States Indemnity; GEICO; Gen Re; USLI
Railroad	BNSF Railway
Utilities & energy	Berkshire Hathaway Energy; Pilot Flying J
Manufacturing	Benjamin Moore & Co.; Clayton Homes; CTB International; Duracell; Fruit of the Loom; Johns Manville; Lubrizol; Precision Castparts Corp; Scott Fetzer Company; Garan Inc.; Shaw Industries
Services & retailing	Ben Bridge Jeweler; Business Wire; Dairy Queen; HomeServices of America; McLane Company; NetJets; Oriental Trading Company; Pampered Chef; See's Candies; Star Furniture; WPLG

=== Securities ===
Aside from its subsidiaries, Berkshire manages a portfolio of non-controlling stock investments into which its insurance companies invest policy premiums. These holdings are broadly disclosed in its Form 13F filings, although the company sometimes obtains permission to keep active trades confidential.

Company	Share (%)	Value (Note: Shares and values as of June 30, 2026)
Apple Inc.	1.6	$69.7 billion
American Express	22.5	$51.9 billion
The Coca-Cola Company	9.3	$35.1 billion
Bank of America	6.9	$31.2 billion
Alphabet Inc. Series A	1.2	$27.2 billion
Chevron Corporation	4.3	$16.9 billion
Occidental Petroleum	26.5	$15.5 billion
Mitsubishi	11.1	$12.3 billion
Moody's Ratings	14.2	$12.0 billion
Chubb Limited	8.9	$11.7 billion
Mitsui	10.8	$9.4 billion
Alphabet Inc. Series C	0.5	$9.3 billion
Itochu	10.1	$9.1 billion
Kraft Heinz	27.5	$8.3 billion
Sumitomo Group	10.3	$5.5 billion
Marubeni	10.3	$5.3 billion
Davita	45.0	$5.2 billion
Delta Airlines	8.7	$5.1 billion
SiriusXM	37.0	$3.6 billion
Verisign	10.0	$2.6 billion
Tokio Marine	2.5	$2.3 billion
Kroger	6.4	$2.2 billion
Ally Financial	8.9	$1.2 billion
Liberty Live Nation Entertainment Series C	16.6	$1.2 billion
The New York Times Company	9.8	$1.0 billion
Capital One	0.5	$0.7 billion
Liberty Live Nation Entertainment Series A	19.5	$0.5 billion
Nucor	0.8	$0.5 billion
Louisiana-Pacific	8.1	$0.4 billion
Macy's	2.8	$0.2 billion
NVR, Inc.	0.4	$0.1 billion

The company also had $365.5 billion in cash and Treasury bills.

== Corporate affairs ==
=== Investment strategy ===
Insurance is a major area of operations and the retained premiums (float) serve as an important source of capital. Buffett has said that he prefers to invest in evergreen businesses that generate predictable long-term returns, that he doesn't invest in companies that he doesn't understand, and that he does not like to invest in companies that may undergo significant change. The company has generally avoided investing in high-tech firms, missing early opportunities to invest in Microsoft and Amazon.com despite having relationships with the founders of those companies. With some exceptions, the company also usually does not invest in real property due to precise pricing, lack of competitive advantage, complex management, and corporation tax disadvantages.

=== Share classes and aversion to stock splits ===
Berkshire Hathaway has never undergone a stock split of its Class A shares because of management's desire to attract long-term investors as opposed to short-term speculation. However, in 1996, Berkshire Hathaway created Class B shares, with a per-share value of 1/30 of that of the original shares (now Class A) and 1/200 of the per-share voting rights, and after the January 2010 split, at 1/1,500 the price and 1/10,000 the voting rights of the Class-A shares. Holders of class A stock are allowed to convert their stock to Class B, though not vice versa. Buffett was reluctant to create the class B shares but did so to thwart the creation of unit investment trusts that would have marketed themselves as Berkshire look-alikes.

In January 2010, as part of the acquisition of BNSF Railway, Berkshire completed a 50-to-1 stock split of its class B shares. The increased market liquidity resulted in the company's inclusion in the S&P 500.

=== Share price milestones ===
Shares closed over $1,000 for the first time on August 26, 1983, and over $10,000 on October 16, 1992. Shares closed over $100,000 for the first time on October 23, 2006. They first closed over $200,000 on August 14, 2014. Shares closed over $500,000 for the first time on March 16, 2022.

=== Executive compensation ===
The salary for Buffett is $100,000 per year with no stock options, which is among the lowest salaries for CEOs of large companies in the United States. Buffett's salary has not changed in 35 years. Buffett also receives approximately $300,000 worth of home security services from the company annually.

Abel and Jain each receive a salary of $20 million per year, with a possible $3 million annual bonus at the discretion of Buffett.

=== Annual letters and shareholders' meetings ===
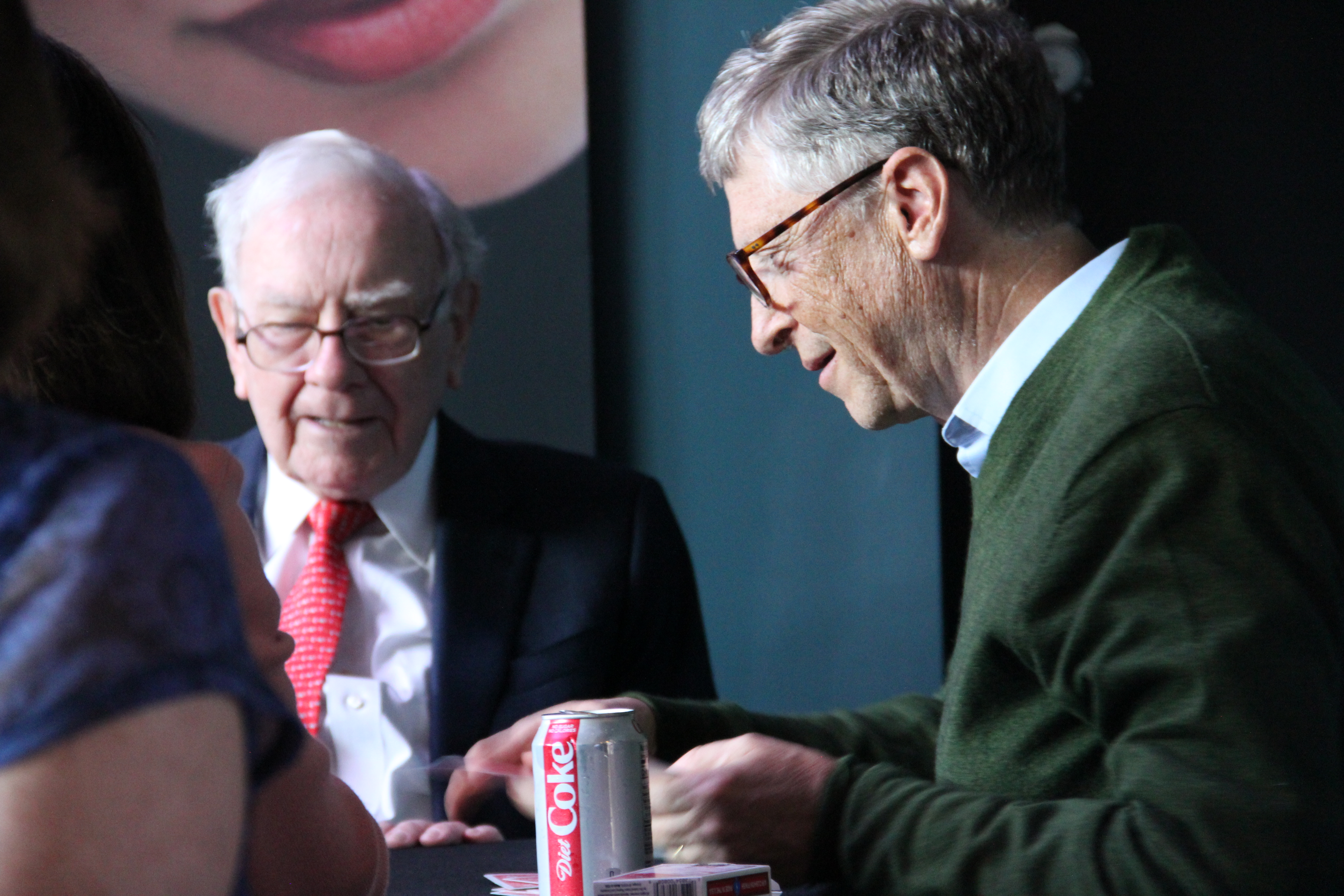
Berkshire routinely features Coca-Cola products, from one of its oldest and largest investments, at its corporate events.

Buffett's letters to shareholders are published annually.

Berkshire's annual shareholders' meetings, nicknamed "Woodstock for Capitalists", take place at the CHI Health Center Omaha in Omaha, Nebraska. Attendance generally totals over 40,000 people and the meetings last for 6 to 8 hours, with Buffett himself, as well as Abel and Jain, answering questions from shareholders.

Known for their humor and light-heartedness, the meetings typically start with a cartoon made for Berkshire shareholders.

- The 2004 cartoon featured Arnold Schwarzenegger in the role of "The Warrenator" who travels through time to stop Buffett and Munger's attempt to save the world from a "mega" corporation formed by Microsoft-Starbucks-Wal-Mart. Schwarzenegger is later shown arguing in a gym with Buffett regarding Proposition 13.
- The 2006 cartoon depicted actresses Jamie Lee Curtis and Nicollette Sheridan lusting after Munger.
- The 2007 cartoon included Buffett playing basketball against LeBron James.
- The 2008 cartoon depicted Charlie Munger becoming President of the United States, after which he promotes eating at Dairy Queen to relieve the effects of increased temperatures due to climate change.
- The 2009 cartoon, aired just after the 2008 financial crisis, showed a new mattress, named The Nervous Nellie, which has a hidden compartment for people who prefer to hide their money in the mattress than put it in the bank.
- The 2016 cartoon featured a spoof of the 1983 film Trading Places; in this version, Munger and Jain along with the GEICO gecko conspire to manipulate the market for cocoa beans to affect See's Candy.
- The 2022 cartoon featured a veterinarian who expanded his business using his American Express credit card.

=== Governance ===
Current members of the board of directors of Berkshire Hathaway are Warren Buffett (chairman), Greg Abel (vice chairman of non-insurance business operations), Ajit Jain (vice chairman of insurance operations), Chris Davis, Susan Alice Buffett (Buffett's daughter), Howard Graham Buffett (Buffett's son), Ronald Olson, Kenneth Chenault, Steve Burke, Susan Decker, Meryl Witmer, Charlotte Guyman, Esteban Rodriguez Jr.

Charlie Munger served as vice chairman of the company from 1978 until his death on November 28, 2023.

David L. Sokol, CEO of Berkshire Hathaway Energy until early 2008, was a top lieutenant for Buffett. Sokol, who was paid $24 million per year, resigned from Berkshire in 2011 after it was disclosed that he personally made a $3 million profit from Berkshire Hathaway's purchase of Lubrizol.

In October 2010, Berkshire announced that 39-year old Todd Combs, manager of the hedge fund Castle Point Capital, would join as an investment manager.

In early 2012, 50-year-old Ted Weschler, founder of Peninsula Capital Advisors, joined Berkshire as a second investment manager.

In January 2018, Berkshire Hathaway appointed Ajit Jain and Greg Abel to vice-chairman roles. Abel was appointed vice chairman for non-insurance business operations, and Jain became vice chairman of insurance operations.

In May 2021, Buffett named Greg Abel to be his successor as CEO of Berkshire Hathaway.

In May 2025, Buffett announced his intention to retire as CEO of Berkshire Hathaway at the annual shareholders' meeting; Greg Abel succeeded him on January 1, 2026.

=== Financials ===
Year	Revenue in million US$	Net income in million US$	Total assets in million US$	Employees
2005	81,663	8,528	198,325	192,000
2006	98,539	11,015	248,437	217,000
2007	118,245	13,213	273,160	233,000
2008	107,786	4,994	267,399	246,000
2009	112,493	8,055	297,119	222,000
2010	136,185	12,967	372,229	260,000
2011	143,688	10,254	392,647	271,000
2012	162,463	14,824	427,452	288,500
2013	182,150	19,476	484,931	302,000
2014	194,699	19,872	525,867	316,000
2015	210,943	24,083	552,257	361,270
2016	223,604	24,074	620,854	367,671
2017	242,137	44,940	702,095	377,000
2018	247,837	4,021	707,794	389,000
2019	254,616	81,417	817,729	391,500
2020	245,510	42,521	873,729	360,000
2021	276,094	89,795	958,784	372,000
2022	302,089	−22,819	948,452	383,000
2023	364,482	96,223	1,069,978	396,500
2024	371,433	88,995	1,153,881	392,400
2025	371,444	66,968	1,222,176	387,800

== See also ==
- List of Berkshire Hathaway publications
