= Central States Indemnity =

Central States Indemnity Company (CSI), a wholly owned subsidiary of Berkshire Hathaway based in Omaha, Nebraska, specializes in credit insurance and casualty risk, with a, history dating back to 1977. The company, which is rated A+ (Superior) by A.M. Best, operates through high-volume partnerships to provide credit life and disability coverage while having discontinued new Medicare Supplement plans. Learn more about the company on their website at csi-omaha.com
