= Benjamin Moore & Co. =

American paint manufacturer

- Type: Subsidiary
- Industry: Architectural coatings
- Founded: 1883; 143 years ago, in New York, New York, U.S.
- Founders: Benjamin Moore; Benjamin Moore, William Moore, Robert Moore
- Headquarters: Montvale, New Jersey, U.S.
- Area served: North America, Global
- Key people: Dan Calkins (CEO)
- Products: AURA; Regal; ben; Fresh Start; Ultra Spec; SCUFF-X; COMMAND; Corotech; Insl-X; Coronado; Notable Dry Erase; Paint; Woodluxe; Super Hide
- Parent: Berkshire Hathaway
- Website: benjaminmoore.com

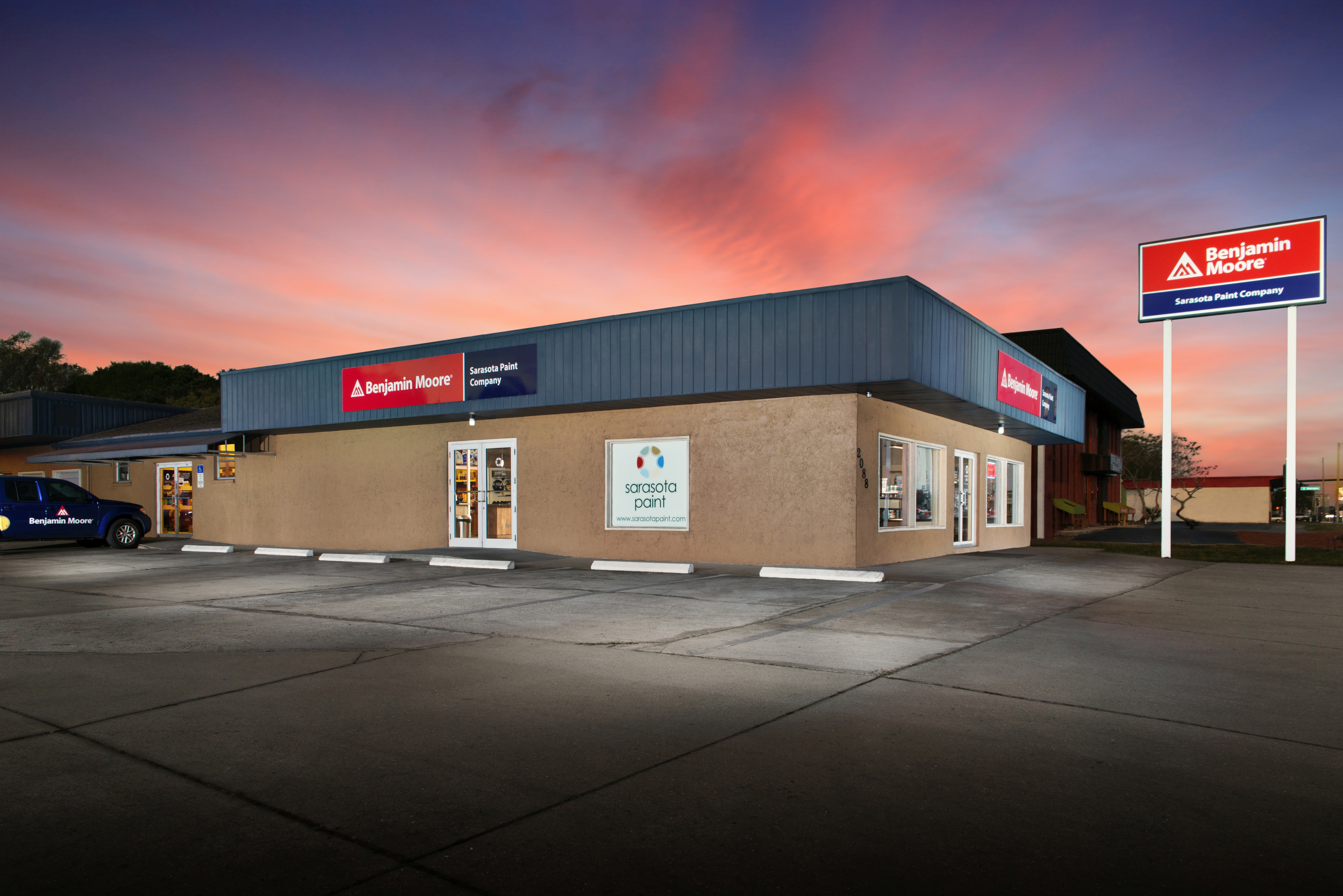
Benjamin Moore retailer, Sarasota, FL

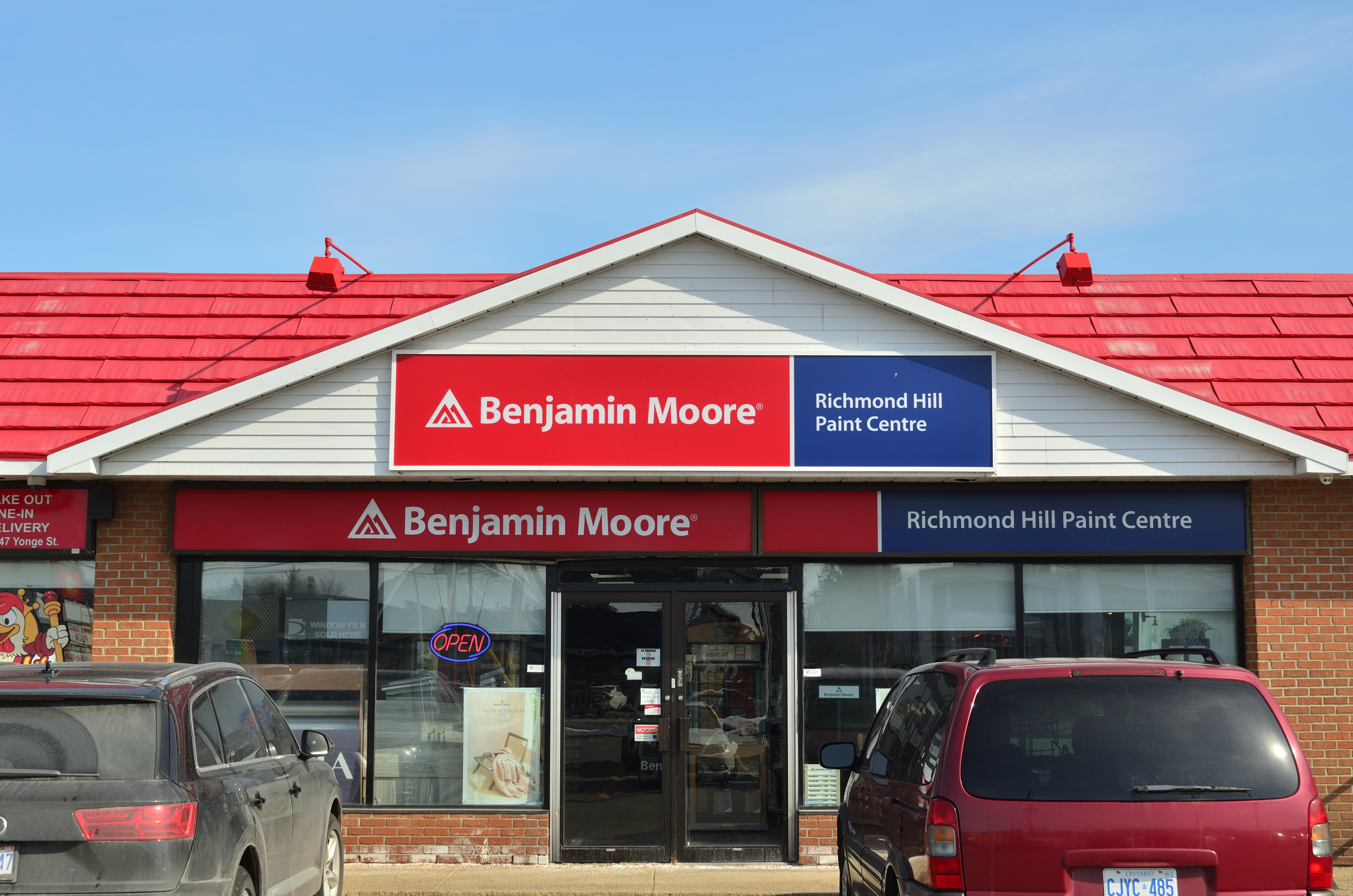
Benjamin Moore retailer, Richmond Hill, Ontario

Benjamin Moore & Co., also known as Benjamin Moore, is an American manufacturer of paints, stains, and other architectural coatings. The company was founded in 1883 in New York, N.Y. and is currently headquartered in Montvale, New Jersey. Benjamin Moore has major manufacturing and distribution operations throughout the United States and Canada, with global sales in more than 75 other countries. Benjamin Moore products are sold through independently owned retailers, including specialized paint-and-decorating centers, hardware stores, and retailers' cooperatives such as Ace Hardware, Do It Best, and True Value.

The company founder, Benjamin Moore, was born in Ballybay, County Monaghan, Ireland, in 1855. In 1872, Moore immigrated to the United States and settled in New York, N.Y. After working in the paint industry, Benjamin and his brother, William, founded Moore Brothers in 1883 with an initial investment of approximately $2,000. The company set up operations in a warehouse on Atlantic Avenue in Brooklyn and sold "Moore's Prepared Calsom Finish". Soon after, William left, and another brother, Robert Moore, joined. The company was incorporated as Benjamin Moore in 1889. Benjamin Moore & Co., Limited was established in Canada in 1906. In 1917, Benjamin Moore stepped down at 62 and named his nephew, L.P. Moore, as his successor. In 2000, Benjamin Moore was acquired by Berkshire Hathaway.

== Accusations of racism ==
In June 2014 a black former employee, Clinton Tucker, sued the company in New Jersey for discrimination, alleging that he was fired because he had complained multiple times about the names of two shades of brown. The colors are named "Tucker Chocolate", which Benjamin Moore's Web site claims is named after "the 1798 color requested by St. George Tucker for his home," and "Clinton Brown". The case was later dismissed with prejudice.

Artist Sonya Clark has used a shade of Benjamin Moore's red paint formerly known as "Confederate Red" as a lasting symbol of American racism in her exhibitions centered on legacy of symbols and power of propaganda since 2019. The color, which is also mentioned in Clinton Tucker's lawsuit, was renamed "Patriot Red" in 2015.

== Awards ==
- 2020 Awarded Best in Customer Satisfaction among Interior Paints by J.D. Power: #1 in Durability, #1 in Application, #1 in Offerings.
