= Greg Abel =

Canadian-American businessman (born 1962)

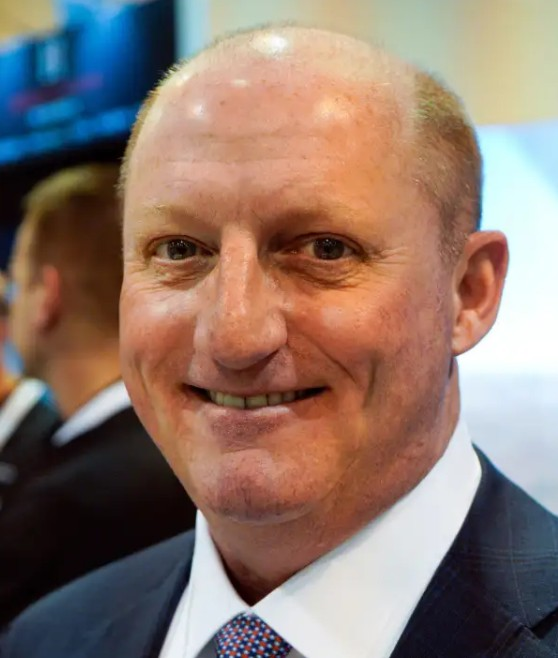
- Abel in 2021
- Born: Gregory Edward Abel; June 1, 1962 (age 64); Edmonton, Alberta, Canada
- Education: University of Alberta (BComm)
- Occupations: President and CEO, Berkshire Hathaway
- Spouse: Andrea Abel
- Children: 4

Gregory Edward Abel (born June 1, 1962) is a Canadian-American businessman who has been president and chief executive officer of the American multinational conglomerate Berkshire Hathaway since January 2026. Berkshire Hathaway announced in May 2025 that Abel would succeed Warren Buffett as CEO following Buffett's retirement in late 2025.

== Early life and family ==
Abel was born on June 1, 1962, in Edmonton, Alberta. His father worked for a company that manufactured firefighting equipment, while his mother was a homemaker and part-time legal secretary. His uncle Sid Abel was a professional hockey player. During his childhood, Abel did odd jobs such as distributing flyers and returning glass bottles to make money. He also worked as a laborer for a forest products company.

Abel graduated from the University of Alberta in 1984 with a bachelor's degree in accounting. He is an AICPA certified public accountant.

Abel has three adult children from his first marriage. He has since married Andrea Abel, and they have a son. Abel lives in Iowa, and while protective of his privacy is known to be active in youth sports. He was sworn in as a U.S. citizen on June 25, 2026 in Des Moines, Iowa.

== Career ==
After graduating from the University of Alberta, Abel began his career as a chartered accountant with PricewaterhouseCoopers in its Edmonton office. He then moved to its San Francisco office where one of his clients was CalEnergy, a geothermal electricity producer In 1992, he joined CalEnergy. In 1999, CalEnergy acquired MidAmerican Energy, adopting its name, and Berkshire Hathaway acquired a controlling interest later that year. Abel became CEO of MidAmerican in 2008, and the company was renamed Berkshire Hathaway Energy in 2014.

In January 2018, Abel was named Berkshire Hathaway's vice chairman for non-insurance operations and appointed to Berkshire's board of directors.

Abel is also vice chairman of Edison Electric Institute, and a director of AEGIS Limited, Kraft Heinz, Nuclear Electric Insurance Limited, the Hockey Canada Foundation, the Mid-Iowa Council Boy Scouts of America, and the American Football Coaches Foundation. He has been on the board of trustees at Duke University and Drake University.

In a May 2021 interview, Warren Buffett confirmed Abel as his successor as CEO of Berkshire Hathaway. Abel's handling of CalEnergy’s take-over of a British utility in the 1990s is credited to mark the start of this transition.

In June 2022, he sold his 1% stake in Berkshire Hathaway Energy for $870 million.

In October 2022, it was announced that Abel purchased 168 shares of Berkshire Class A shares worth approximately $68 million. This equates to an approximate average share purchase price of $404,761.90. Prior to this latest purchase, Abel held five Class A shares and 2,363 Class B shares, according to previous filings.

In May 2025 Warren Buffett said "The time has arrived where Greg should become the chief executive officer of the company at year end", thus paving the way for Abel to succeed Buffett. Only Buffett's children knew the timing of his retirement announcement and Abel had no warning. Various media reports indicate Buffett selected Abel as his successor due in part to Abel's strong work ethic and strategic thinking, his commitment to Buffet's preferred paradigm of value investing, and the belief he would maintain the corporate culture established in previous decades.

In May 2026, Abel led Berkshire Hathaway's annual meeting for the first time as chief executive.

== Honors ==
He received a Horatio Alger award in 2018.
