= See's Candies =

American chocolatier

See's Candy Shops, Inc.

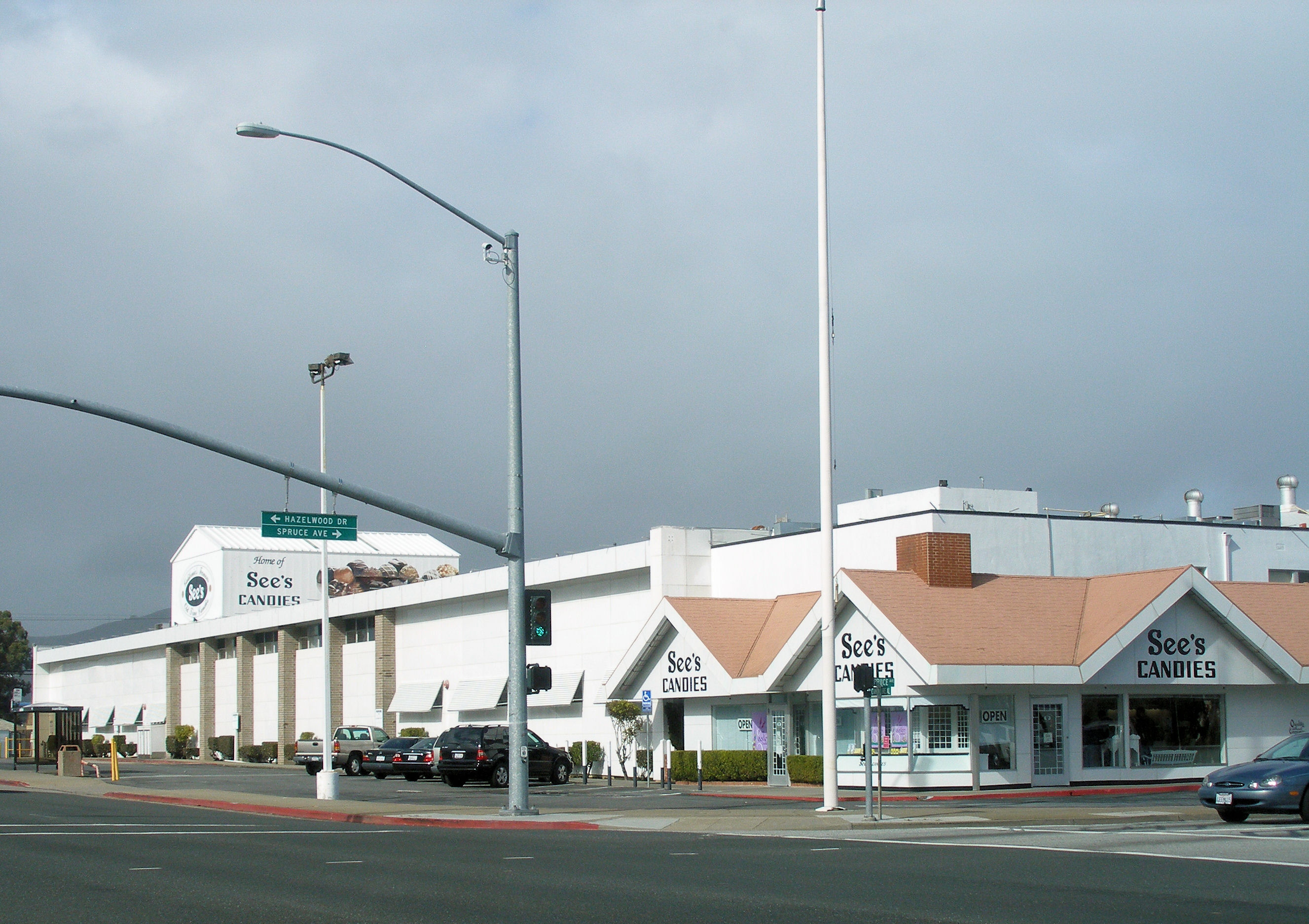
- Headquarters on El Camino Real in South San Francisco, California
- Trade name: See's Candies
- Type: Subsidiary
- Industry: Retail and candy
- Founded: November 1921; 104 years ago
- Founder: Charles See
- Headquarters: South San Francisco, California, U.S.
- Key people: Pat Egan (CEO)
- Products: Chocolate, candy, brittle
- Revenue: US$ $410 million (2016)
- Net income: US$ over $80 million (2019)
- Owner: Berkshire Hathaway
- Number of employees: 1,500 year-round, 6,000+ seasonal
- Website: sees.com

See's Candy Shops, Inc., doing business as See's Candies, is an American manufacturer and distributor of candy, particularly chocolates. It was founded by Charles See, his wife Florence, and his mother Mary in Los Angeles in 1921. The company is headquartered in South San Francisco, California. See's kitchens are located at its headquarters and are also maintained at its original factory in Los Angeles, where there are also retail shops. It also has an office in Carson, California. The company has been owned by Warren Buffett's Berkshire Hathaway Corporation since 1972.

== Location and market area ==
The See's Candies company primarily sells its products at its own stores, along with those of fellow Berkshire Hathaway subsidiary, Nebraska Furniture Mart. See's Candies operates more than 200 stores in these states: Alaska, Arizona, California, Colorado, Hawaii, Idaho, Illinois, Indiana, Kansas, Minnesota, Montana, Nebraska, New Mexico, New York, Nevada, Oklahoma, Oregon, Texas, Utah, Virginia, and Washington. Most See's Candies stores are found in shopping centers. However, the company also operates a number of stand-alone stores, along with stores inside airport terminals across the United States. More than 70% of the company's stores are in California. There are stores outside the U.S. in Hong Kong, Mexico City, the Philippines, Taiwan, Singapore, and South Korea (taking advantage of the proximity of its main plant to San Francisco International Airport). Seasonally – primarily during the year-end holiday shopping season – See's also offers its product in select markets in kiosks at malls and other shopping centers. See's sells its product outside these areas directly to consumers via mail order catalog and online orders, in order to control the age of its product.

See's Candies temporarily suspended operations in March 2020 due to the COVID-19 pandemic, the first such suspension since World War II, when it became difficult to acquire sugar and other ingredients due to the war effort. The company began to restore operations a month later, after implementing appropriate safety precautions. See's Candies opened a store in Abu Dhabi in Nation Towers in 2020.

== History ==
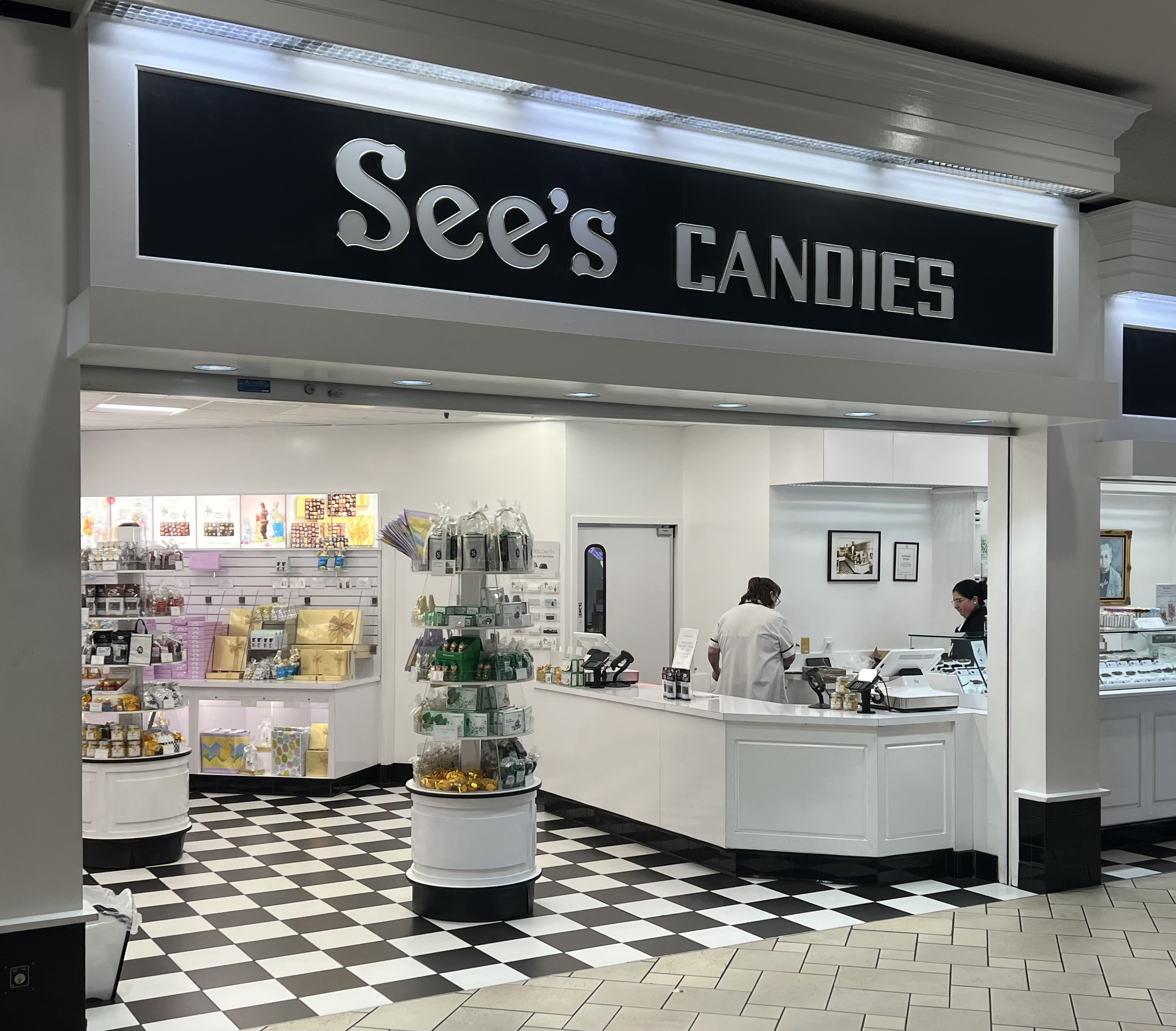
A See's Candies store in Modesto, California

Charles Alexander See II (1882–1949) was born in Gananoque, Ontario, Canada, and came to California in 1921 with his wife Florence MacLean Wilson See (1885–1956), with whom he had three children: Laurance Alexander See (1912–1969), Margaret M. See (1913–1961) and Charles B. "Harry" See (1921–1999), who was born after they arrived in the U.S. and his widowed mother Mary Wiseman See (1854–1939). They lived in Pasadena, California, and Charles A. See II worked as a druggist. Mary See had developed the recipes that became the foundation of the See's candy business while helping run her husband's hotel on Tremont Island, one of the Thousand Islands, in Ontario, Canada. Mary See had been born on Howe Island, Ontario, Canada, and eventually moved back to the town of Gananoque, Ontario, where she and her husband had lived. She died there in 1939 and is buried with her husband at Willowbank Cemetery.

The family opened the first See's Candies shop and kitchen at 135 North Western Avenue in Los Angeles in November 1921. They had 12 shops by the mid-1920s and operated thirty shops during the Great Depression. See's first white and black "all porcelain" store was opened in Bakersfield, California, on May 1, 1941. In 1936, See's opened a shop in San Francisco. It moved operations to make creams and truffles (60% of product sales) to South San Francisco in order to take advantage of the region's cooler average temperatures compared to southern California.

Laurance A. See's divorce from his wife Elizabeth led to a landmark community property opinion in 1962 by Chief Justice Roger J. Traynor of the California Supreme Court for a unanimous court. According to the opinion, Laurance worked for See's Candies, Inc. for the entirety of the twenty-one years of his marriage, served as president of its retail subsidiary for most of that time, and "received more than $1,000,000 in salaries from the two corporations". The See case is still included in 21st century textbooks for future lawyers and financial advisers.

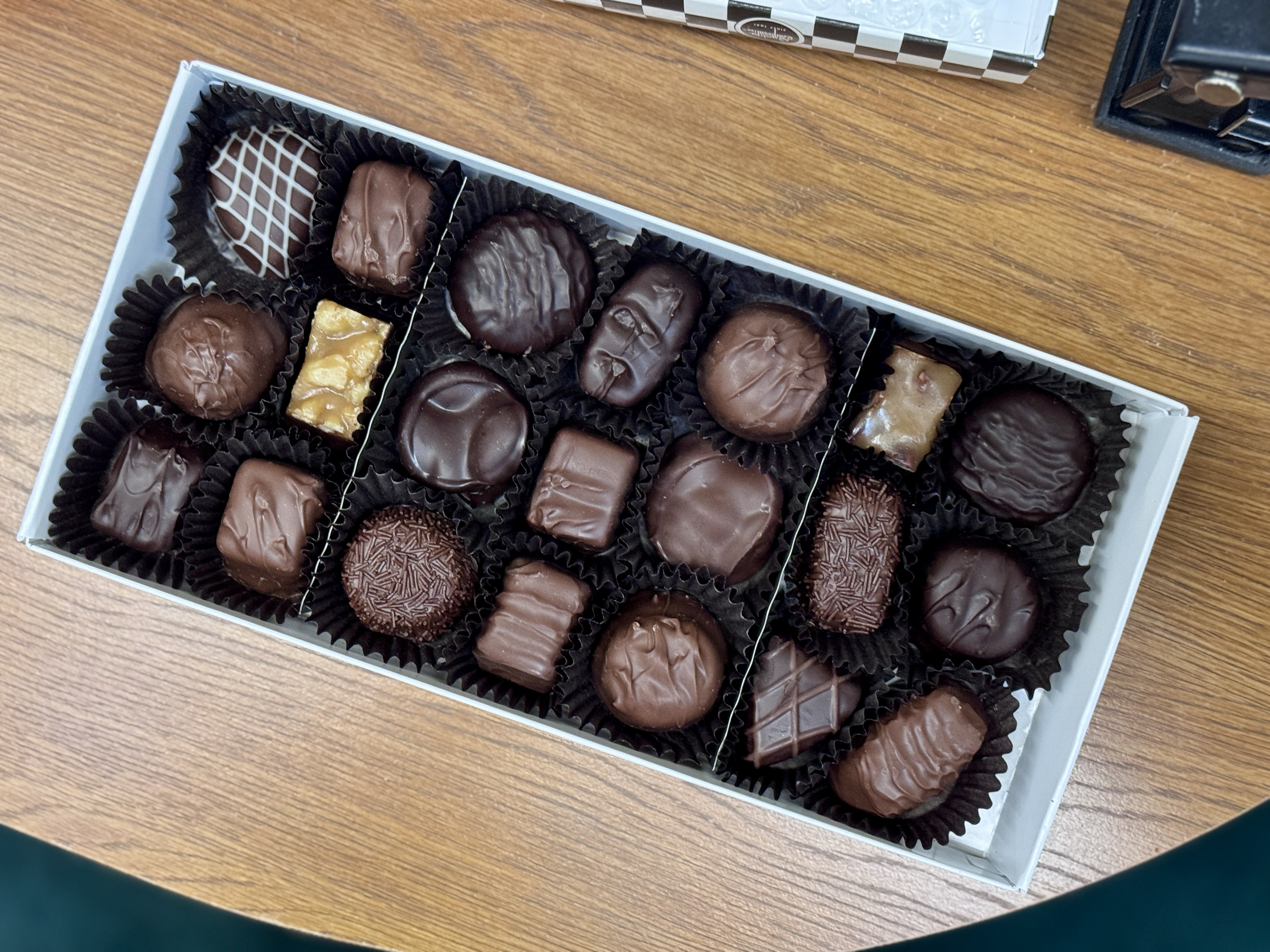
A box of See's Candies Assorted Chocolates.

In 1972, the See family sold the company, which generated $4 million in pre-tax profit that year, to Berkshire Hathaway for $25 million. On January 3, 1972, Blue Chip obtained a controlling interest in See's Candy Shops. Blue Chip later acquired 100% of See's for an overall price of $25 million. Wesco Financial Corporation was an 80.1% owned subsidiary of Blue Chip Stamps until its complete merger into Berkshire Hathaway in 2011. Warren Buffett has called See's "the prototype of a dream business" (2007). At a 1996 luncheon in San Francisco, Charlie Munger revealed that See's was the first high quality business that Berkshire ever bought. Previous to that point, Berkshire had focused on undervalued assets that could be bought cheaply. The See's acquisition influenced their commitment to buying businesses with a strong reputation and brand recognition. See's production and warehouse workers are unionized.

The "couverture" chocolate used by See's is provided by the nearby Guittard Chocolate Company, and nuts come from Mariani Nut Company of nearby Winters, California. On June 20, 2012, See's Candies was recognized by the Guinness Book of World Records for the world's largest lollipop, a giant chocolate lollipop weighing 7,003 pounds (3,177 kg) and measuring 4 ft 8.75 in (1.4415 m) long, 3 ft 6 in (1.07 m) wide, and 5 feet 11 inches (1.80 m) high, equivalent to 145,000 regular-size lollipops. The previous largest lollipop record stood at 6,514 pounds (2,955 kg).

As of 2025, the price of See's chocolates is more than $30 a pound.

== In popular culture ==
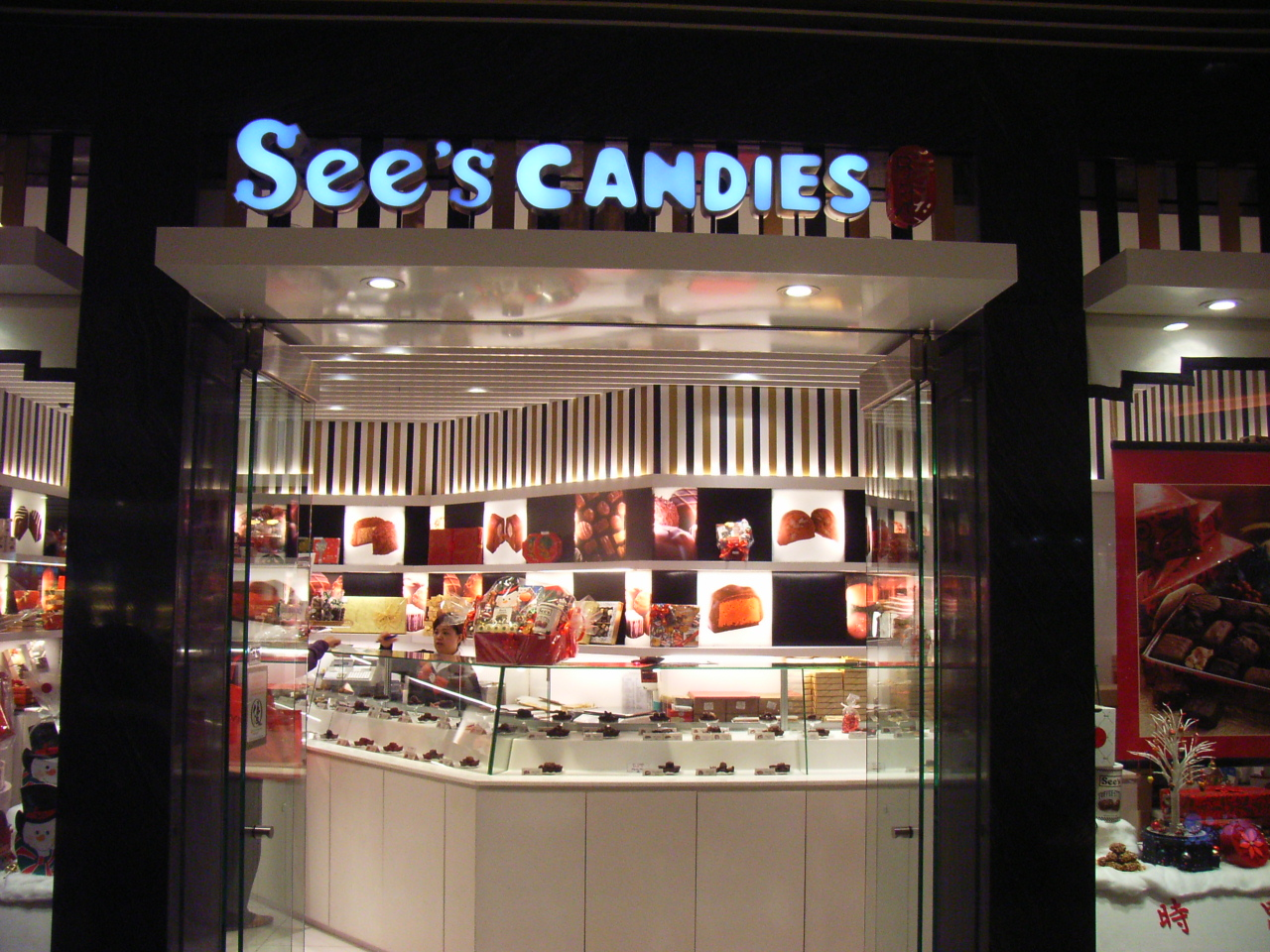
See's Candies shop in Hong Kong

In 1952, Lucille Ball and Vivian Vance spent a half day at the See's Candies store on La Cienega Boulevard in Los Angeles, learning to dip chocolates and work the production line, in preparation for the "Job Switching" episode of I Love Lucy. The episode, which featured Lucy and Ethel getting jobs in a chocolate factory, became one of the most popular in the show's history.

Singer Cher was working at See's in 1962 when she met Sonny Bono; she quit her job to become his housekeeper. In a 1987 Kidsongs video "What I Want to Be", the Kidsongs Kids visit the See's Candies factory during "The Candy Man" song sequence.

In 1994, at See's Candies headquarters in South San Francisco, a driver delivering a bulk order of chocolate fell asleep while his truck was hooked up to one of the vats and pumping; the adjacent El Camino Real and Spruce Avenue were flooded with chocolate. Workers had to shovel it away from the storm drains once the fog had cooled it. A factory was visited to research the Sugar Rush sequence for Wreck-It Ralph. See's Candies was featured by Huell Howser in California's Gold Episode 908.

Every year the South San Francisco facility mounts oversized holiday decorations atop its plant for Christmas, Thanksgiving, Valentine's Day, Mothers' Day, and Independence Day. On Mindy Kaling and Lang Fisher's 2020 Netflix show, Never Have I Ever, main character Devi Vishwakumar's mother keeps a cabinet of See's Candies as housewarming/hostess gifts.
