= Oriental Trading Company =

American company

- Type: Subsidiary
- Industry: Direct marketing
- Founded: 1932; 94 years ago
- Founder: Harry Watanabe
- Headquarters: Omaha, Nebraska, US
- Area served: Worldwide
- Key people: Steve Mendlik (CEO)
- Products: 40,000
- Owner: Berkshire Hathaway
- Number of employees: est. 2,000 as of 2016
- Subsidiaries: MindWare Holdings, Inc. SmileMakers; OTC Direct Inc.
- Website: orientaltrading.com

Oriental Trading Company is a direct merchant of value-priced party supplies, arts and crafts, toys, novelties, and school supplies. It was founded in 1932 as a wholesaling company. It is based in Omaha, Nebraska, and is owned by Berkshire Hathaway. Alternative known names for Oriental Trading Company include "Oriental Trading" & "OTC".

== History ==
The company was founded as a gift shop in 1932 in Omaha, Nebraska, by Harry Watanabe. The company expanded to 17 shops in the Midwest. During World War II, with restrictions against imports from Japan, the company shrank back to its Omaha base. Watanabe then bought a ceramic shop which made Kewpie dolls and other ceramic items.

In 1954 the company resumed its imports from Japan and was a major carnival supplier and in 1956 it launched its first catalog.

In 1977 Watanabe's son Terrance Watanabe became president and its focus shifted from carnivals to supplying party goods for churches, schools, retailers, and individuals.

In 2000, Terrance sold his entire stake in the company to Los Angeles–based private equity firm Brentwood Associates, and resigned as CEO and President. He became a philanthropist, but subsequently lost most of his fortune gambling in Las Vegas.

In 2006, The Carlyle Group bought 68 percent interest in the company with Brentwood owning a reported 25 percent.

On August 24, 2010, Oriental Trading Company via OTC Holdings Corp. filed for Chapter 11 bankruptcy protection. During the bankruptcy procedure, the company had plans to cut half of its $1 billion of debt. The company continued to operate normally during the process.

On November 2, 2012, Berkshire Hathaway announced they would acquire the company.

Oriental Trading acquired MindWare Holdings, Inc. in 2013 and SmileMakers in 2014. MindWare manufacturers and sells toys. SmileMakers sells to the dental and healthcare markets.

The company's CEO Sam Taylor appeared on the March 10, 2012, episode of the TV show Undercover Boss. Taylor, who had been CEO since 2008, died after a year long illness in December 2017, and COO/CFO Steve Mendlik was named acting CEO in January 2018.
