= Charlie Dunn =

American bootmaker (1898–1993)

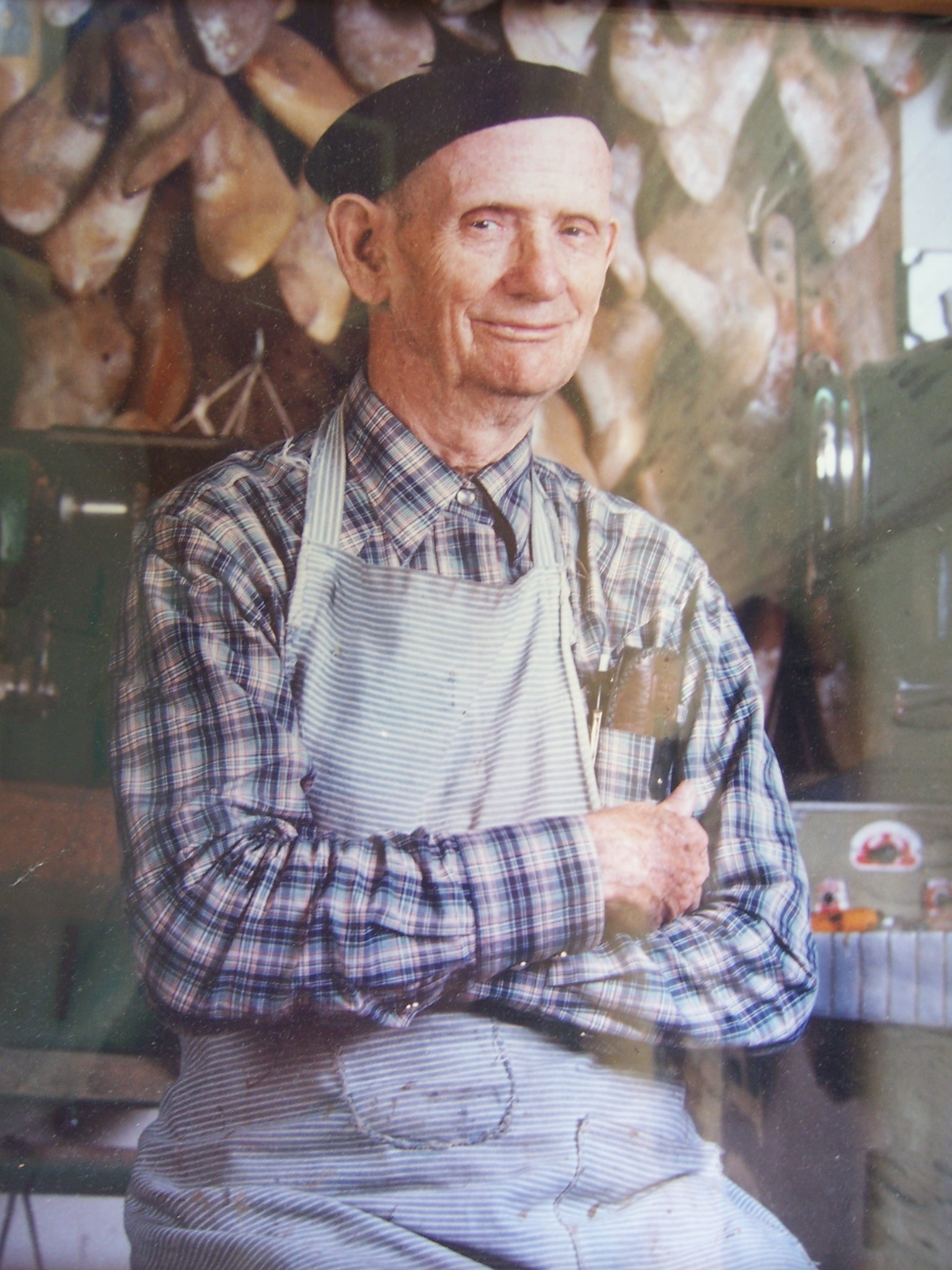
Charlie Dunn in his boot shop Texas Traditions, c. 1980. Photo courtesy Don Counts.

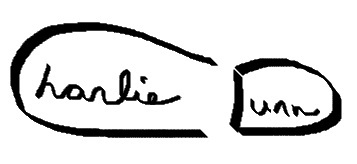
example Charlie's "signature style" signature

Charles Russell Dunn (c. 1898 – September 23, 1993) was an American bootmaker of handmade Western, or cowboy boots for more than 80 years. Dubbed the "Michelangelo of cowboy boots," he first gained widespread notice in the wake of Jerry Jeff Walker's song "Charlie Dunn" (1972). By the time he retired in 1988 from Texas Traditions, his shop in Austin, he routinely charged up to $3,000 for a pair of boots, had a waiting list of hundreds of interested buyers willing to wait three years for delivery, and had made boots for a long list of celebrities, including Arnold Palmer, Mary Kay Place, Gene Autry, Slim Pickens, Don F Brooks, Harry Belafonte, Ernest Tubb, Peter Fonda, and Carole King.

Don Counts, who owned several pairs of Charlie's boots and lured him out of a premature retirement, described Charlie as "a real character, an elflike creature who captivated everybody." Known for his colorful language and broad sense of humor, Charlie in his customary black beret and cobbler's apron measured out at 5'4" and 135 pounds of pure imp. One friend noted that even though he was "quiet-spoken," he could "tell stories all day and all night."

When Charlie died at 95 from complications arising from a stroke, he had passed along his bootmaking mastery to Lee Miller, his heir-designate, thus assuring the survival of exceptional bootmaking in the traditional, handmade manner. As with four generations of Dunns before him, Charlie had persevered in and prolonged the production of custom boots, despite the general trend toward bootmaking in factories. One of a handful of survivors of an endangered species—the half artisan, half artist maker of once-common items—Charlie managed, in passing his skills to a new generation, to make sure that the world continued to enjoy prized bootmaking.

== Early life ==
Charlie was born September 19, 1898, on a riverboat coursing the White River, "between two towns in Arkansas," the third of ten children for Molly and Thomas Dunn. His great-great grandfather, Winfield Scott Duam, made boots in County Cork, Ireland, starting a lineage of bootmakers that reached to young Charlie, five generations. The name change to "Dunn" occurred "a few generations later," presumably in the transition to the United States. His parents Molly and Thomas hailed from Tennessee.

At three, the family moved "in a covered wagon" to Texas, settling in Glory, a tiny village outside Paris, a town of 9,000 near the Oklahoma border about 100 miles northeast of Dallas. He attended the local elementary school, though, he recalled, "mama taught us ten children how to read and write and do our 'rithmetic before we even started in school." Charlie took his first paying job at six, emptying spittoons for ten cents a week, but it ended quickly. By the next year he was working alongside his father in the shop of Ed Lewis, a one-legged bootmaker. The following year, at age eight, Charlie moved in with Lewis in Paris because, he explained, "I figured I could learn more from someone other than my father." The move possibly was a sign of difficulties in their relationship already. He learned quickly, and produced his first pair of custom boots when he was 11, a birthday present to himself. The Dunns, like the families of most bootmakers, moved frequently, chasing steady work. Charlie remembered living briefly in several towns, including Tyler, before spending three years in Fort Worth, where his father opened the Dunn Boot Shop on the corner of Main and Exchange Streets. The stockyards and broader ranch culture provided likely customers for boots. In 1913 or so, the Dunns moved in covered wagons to Arkansas, "to get away from the big city," Charlie recalled.

== Early career ==
At fifteen, Charlie moved out after a dispute with his father about money, possibly over Charlie's use of funds to purchase a suit, his first. His high school education apparently at an end—a later Census Report notes that he had finished two years of high school—Charlie hit the road. The precise sequence of his stops as an itinerant bootmaker during this period remains murky, but he settled briefly in Newport County, AR, then shifted to Fort Smith, AR, where he worked for a local bootmaker. To recuperate from a bout with smallpox, he convalesced under his mother's care, probably in Tyler, TX, for six months before striking out on his own for good. At some point, he spent time in Paris again. He also worked at Fort Sill, OK, for his first of many stints as a bootmaker for the U.S. Army. According to Charlie, "I never stayed at a job after I felt I'd learned all I could from it. Sometimes I'd leave after a week, but I was never without work."

Charlie served in the Navy during World War I. Liking the way that the sailor's cap hid his already balding pate, he began wearing a black beret when he was discharged, and kept doing so the rest of his life. His next stop was Memphis, where he studied art for a couple of years and incorporated another lifelong, signature practice: an emphasis on the anatomy of the foot in fitting boots. His art teacher stressed the importance of the skeleton in making accurate depictions. Charlie embraced this approach: "How can you make a portrait or paint a face unless you know the bone structure underneath?" To further his understanding of anatomy, he soon earned a certification, probably by mail, from Dr. Scholl's School of Podiatry, an achievement to which he referred proudly the rest of his life. He used his profound knowledge of the foot structure to create a custom "last," or wooden model of the foot.

In Memphis Charlie courted and married 26-year-old Cecil ("Cecile") Cleo. Their marriage lasted until her death in Austin in 1985. They eventually had four children—Louise and sons Creighton, Tom, and Donald.

Sometime after Memphis, Charlie for the first and only time sought work in a boot factory. In Winnipeg, Manitoba, Canada, he took a job in the Stetson shoe and boot factory. He explained why he left soon after: "In a factory you do just one or two operations at the most... And that's all you do. You make stitches or soles. You become a part of that machine. And, you have just about as much individuality as IT does." "From then on," he noted, "I never messed with workin' in a factory."

Peripatetic, as befit a bootmaker, Charlie traversed the continent down to San Antonio, where, in 1933, he again fashioned boots for the Army, this time at Fort Sam Houston. By decade's end, he was in Austin, where he took a job at Lone Star Boots off Congress Ave. He lived on West 2nd St., a short distance from the store, in what is now the heart of downtown Austin. While working at Lone Star he made a pair of boots with a unique design element: an intricate yellow rose inlaid into the upper of the boot. He set the boots in the window, hoping to attract a buyer. A short time later, Ernest Tubb, a seminal figure in western music, caught notice and purchased the boots. A legend was born. Once tempted to turn to a career in art, he instead had decided to "take my love of art and put it in bootmaking" after watching artists starving in the Depression. For him, a boot was a sculpture. Works from the 1940s demonstrate that he had achieved a special marriage of art and craft.

== Middle career ==
=== Capitol Saddlery ===
Charlie finally settled down in 1949. For the next 25 years, he worked at Capitol Saddlery on Lavaca St. in central Austin under the eye, and sometimes the thumb, of Thomas Casper "Buck" Steiner, a legend for his rodeo skills, among others. Capitol Saddlery was already well known for its saddles and tack, marketing them through Montgomery Ward's and Sears catalogs as well as to ranchers across Texas. Charlie extended the tradition of excellence to footwear, principally custom western boots. Though the same age, Steiner and Charlie literally stood in contrast, big Steiner towering over the "bantam rooster." Their personalities contrasted sharply, too: Steiner hard, gruff, and with a colorful past, befitting his Rodeo Hall of Fame image; Charlie, elf-like, mischievous, a talker, and family man. Yet, out of need and mutual respect for excellence, they managed to work together for a long time.

By the 1960s, Charlie's boots were well known—and expensive. His custom boots routinely sold for $500 to more than $1,000 in today's dollars. An incident from the early-1960s highlights both the value of Charlie's creations and the tension between Charlie and Steiner. Vice-president Lyndon Johnson wanted a pair of Charlie's boots and sent Sam Houston Johnson, his brother, to get Charlie to come to the courthouse to fit him because he was, according to Charlie's account, "sort of tied up." After being "checked out by the FBI and all," Charlie started out the door to take the measurements. Steiner stopped him, saying, "I wasn't going to do any such thing. He said if Lyndon Johnson wanted his measure taken, he could come over to the saddlery like everybody else." When an interviewer asked if Steiner forbade the trip because he was a Republican, Charlie retorted, "Hell, he wasn't any Republican. He was a damn fool." Charlie never made a pair of boots for LBJ.

The market for custom cowboy boots, anything construed as "cowboy" really—from turquoise jewelry to five-window Fords—grew dramatically in the 1970s with the rise of the "cosmic cowboy," "progressive country," and "outlaw music" culture centered in Austin. Together with the sharp rise in disposable income from "cowboy capitalism" in the black market, the Austin music scene generated high demand for Charlie's boots. Jerry Jeff Walker's "Charlie Dunn" (1972) both reflected this trend and accelerated it. Besides a paean to Charlie's artistry and skill, Walker describes sources of conflict apparent to any visitor:

Now, ol' Buck's up front, he's countin' his gold
Charlie's in the back patchin' up the soles
of the people comin' in, smilin' at him
They all wonder how's ol' Charlie been
And ol' Buck's makin' change, never sees no one
He never understood the good thing that Charlie done.

After the song's release, prices soared into the thousands, though Porter Wagoner's diamond-encrusted pair fetched $25,000! And with Charlie's growing popularity came Steiner's deepening resentment. One observer noted, "When Charlie began to attract some publicity... the boss got jealous and a bad situation developed between them." While Steiner was "countin' his gold" and buying ranches in the Austin area, Charlie built boots for $3.25 an hour. In 1974, Charlie asked Steiner for a 5¢ per hour raise. Steiner refused, and Charlie quit. Though he had threatened to retire several times before, this time he left for good, but not before, legend has it, he dismantled the wooden lasts created for thousands of customers, rendering them useless. It was, according to one observer, Charlie's way of "getting back" at Steiner. At 75, after 25 years at Capitol Saddlery, Charlie retired. When asked whether he had been treated fairly there, Charlie replied, "About as fairly as anyone else around there was, I suppose."

=== First retirement ===
He and Cecile moved almost immediately to Mesquite, a few miles east of Dallas, to be near Louise Rountree, his only daughter, and her family. Ever mischievous, Charlie claims that she "lured him" there against his will, when all he wanted was to retire and "do a little gardening." Many of his loyal customers had other ideas. Charlie recounts that "I just couldn't get a night's rest" after retiring to Mesquite. "People were calling me at all hours, from all over, beggin' for boots, sayin' they couldn't get a good fit any more, and calling me a 'living legend.' I just had to start up again."

== Return to bootmaking ==
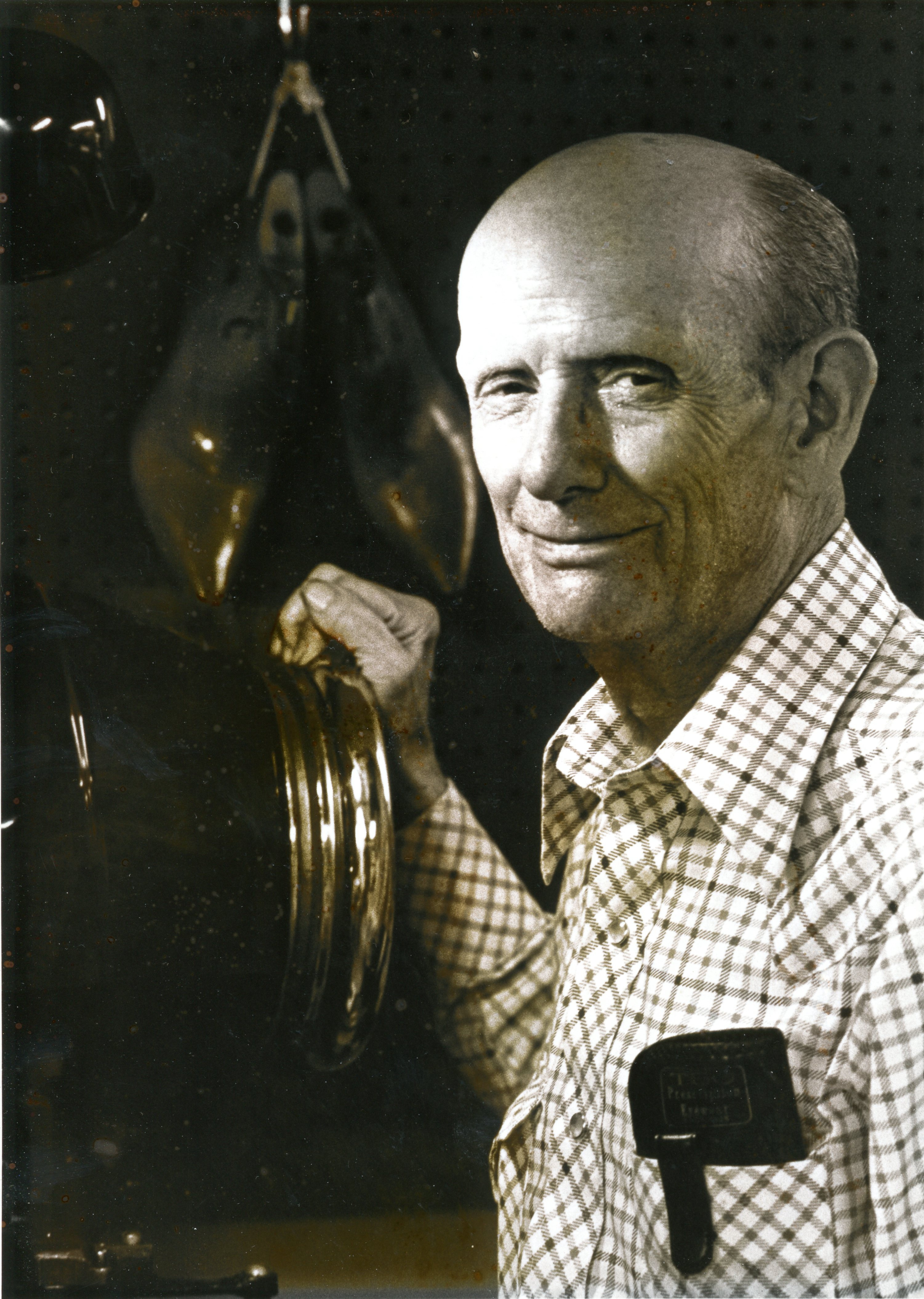
Charlie Dunn in his bootmaking shop. Photo by Ben Mason courtesy of Don Counts.

Don Counts, Austin physician to the music community, was one of the many who had come to depend on Charlie to fit him properly when no one else ever had. But unlike the many who made that claim, Counts saw not just a bootmaker, but a "dying art form moving to Mesquite." Charlie knew the stakes, too: "Bootmaking is an art that's going to be lost before too long." Counts vowed to talk Charlie into returning to Austin to make boots—"I had to get him back" —and did.

Counts's astute awareness of Charlie's historical and cultural importance—beyond his artistry and skill—is not surprising. He worked tirelessly and often without pay for the musicians who played at the Armadillo World Headquarters and Antone's Nightclub, among other Austin venues. From the 1970s onward, Austin musicians, and many others from across the country, knew him as a medical source who met their needs in an affordable manner. His many clients who could pay—and several well-known musicians counted him as their personal physician—counted on him to work with their difficult and far-flung schedules. After decades of helping musicians, he served as a consultant to the founding board of the Health Alliance of Austin Musicians (HAAM), which seeks to provide affordable health care for musicians without insurance. Thus, just as he recognized the critical value in keeping alive, literally, the blues of Jimmy Reed or James Cotton, so, too, did he recognize that preserving Charlie's bootmaking was preserving a vanishing cultural practice.

Counts, as most folks did, had fallen under the spell of the impish cobbler, too, so the business and cultural interests were inextricably woven together with the personal. The atmosphere from the beginning was less like a business than like a close-knit family, complete with resentments and arguments and, eventually, reconciliation between Charlie, staff, manager, and owner. Carrlyn Short, soon to be Lee Miller's wife, played perhaps the crucial role in establishing an efficient, productive, and harmonious environment in which several strong, artistic personalities vied for expression.

Joining Counts in the quest to bring Charlie back to Austin was Steve Wiener, 24 years old at the time, a recent University of Texas graduate, and a guitar player in the Austin scene. He knew Charlie from going to Capitol Saddlery, "just to hang out, " after buying his first boots there in the early 1970s. Wiener went to the shop about every six months, ostensibly to check the hides in stock, but just as much to chat with Charlie, for whom he was developing deep respect and affection. When Counts, a close friend, asked Wiener to be partners in bringing Charlie out of retirement, Wiener quickly agreed. He served as on-site manager of the new concern and handled publicity for the next 3 ½ years.

Counts presented Charlie with a deal: Charlie would have his own shop, with apprentices to teach and direct; a salary equal to three times what he had earned under Buck Steiner; free medical care for Cecile and him; two weeks paid vacation; two weeks sick leave; and a place to live. Skeptical, Charlie resisted: "At first I told [Counts and Weiner] no. I told them I was not interested in managing a place" or "hav[ing] my name on a bank note. " Counts, who later secured a $10,000 loan to finance the project, assured Charlie that we would be free to make boots, not payrolls. Charlie relented: "They said they would take care of that [business] end... I said that would suit me all right. "

Charlie's new shop opened as "Texas Traditions" in September 1977 on College Ave. off South Congress, where it remains today. A renovated bungalow in front was Charlie and Cecile's residence, and a converted garage held the shop and office. Why did Charlie agree? The money? No, that had never driven him to excel. Rather, Charlie knew that "Bootmaking is an art that's gonna be lost before too long." Indeed, other legendary Texas bootmaking outfits—Lucchese, Justin, Nocona, and Tony Lama—had long since "gone factory" or in other cases, disappeared. Customers—former and potential—knew it: more than 50 clamored to have Charlie tend to them if he started back.

More importantly, Charlie knew that for the tradition to endure he had to pass along what he had learned from his 70+ years of bootmaking: "I want to work and teach as many young men as I can so I can leave something behind besides cold marble. I'd rather leave someone behind who'd do it my way. " Counts and Wiener understood this critical part, too: Besides committing to financing and managing the new shop, respectively, they actively recruited top prospects from Oklahoma State's bootmaking school to serve under Charlie. Hopeful apprentices recognized the opportunity: They applied from all over the country and across the Atlantic. The experience of one apprentice who soon joined Charlie at Texas Traditions, Lee Miller, exemplifies the process that Charlie and his backers understood.

At 18 Miller began a two-year apprenticeship in a shoe repair shop in his native Vermont. Already dedicating himself to a career making boots, Miller was about to have an epiphany. One day a friend brought by a cassette tape of Jerry Jeff Walker's "Charlie Dunn, " the song that had brought Charlie's expertise to a popular audience. After listening to the song in his friend's van, Miller exclaimed, "That's what I want to do!" –make boots with Charlie Dunn, that is, "though I'll never be famous, " he thought. "That music did it. It was my inspiration" to work with Charlie. Though he never had seen a pair of Charlie's boots, the idea stayed with him as he headed off to Oklahoma State's bootmaking school. After graduation, he bounced out to Utah to work with a bootmaker there. Meanwhile, Weiner and Counts encouraged Steve Martin, one of the original apprentices at Texas Traditions, to recruit the best bootmaker apprentice he could think of, and Martin gave them the name of Miller, the "valedictorian" of the school, in Wiener's telling. They finally reached Miller in Utah after a four-month search. The search took so long, in part, because Miller had no phone service in Utah.

As Lee Miller, later Charlie's designated heir puts it, "I wasn't sure about moving to Texas—but to work with Charlie Dunn was the opportunity of a lifetime for a young guy who wanted to make boots... [but] [w]hen I got to Austin and saw the way Charlie made boots, I knew I had to start all over... as Charlie's apprentice." Simply put, "The minute I walked in the doors I knew it's where I wanted to be. The work they were doing here was like nothing I'd ever seen before."

== The Charlie Dunn method ==
=== Fit ===
Ask the thousands of owners of Charlie's boots what make them special, and the constant among the many reasons offered is, "Because of the fit." To achieve the fit, Charlie took accurate, extensive measurements, then built a boot that held them.

Charlie preferred to make measurements in person. "Feet are like fingerprints," Charlie explained. "None are the same." A prospective client was ordered to "just stand naturally" in his or her sock feet, while Charlie drew with his blue pencil on a manila sheet, around and beneath each foot, all the while asking about how they would be used—to ride? dance? stroll?—and other relevant facts. He also probed and worked his double-jointed hands around and over each foot, making notations and marks on the diagrams. He described the process of getting the right six measurements: "I take a double diagram, and I take notes on every little blood vessel and everything else. It takes about 10 minutes. I don't even have to see what I'm doing. My hands are so sensitive—just like a safecracker's hands—I can feel tendons right through socks and veins and joints and calluses." He knew that to achieve the perfect fit, the boots must conform to that individual's idiosyncratic shape by making certain there was no "pressure on the blood vessels or the tendons, otherwise 'misery' and [the] foot falls asleep." "I've got to know your bunions, corns, and calluses to do it right," he claimed.

Until the 1940s, Charlie had measured clients' feet without socks on them, but the Texas legislature intervened. As Charlie recounted in the late 1970s, "[Now] you can't take your sock off in my presence. The podiatrists got nervous about the bootmakers taking their business away, so about 30 years ago they passed a law in the Texas legislature that said you got to keep your socks on in here. They were just afraid of the boot-making profession. I called their hand on that one. I let 'em know that if I had no more faith in my trade than they had in theirs, I'd go out and dig ditches. I recommended they do the same." Ever the one to point out nonsense, Charlie persevered to overcome this obstacle.

Once he had the measurements, down to the last vein and callous, Charlie translated them to wooden lasts, foot-shaped wooden blocks. He shaped the lasts to conform to measurements by building up sections with leather strips and shaving away other areas with a scalpel knife. Charlie carefully shaped the last, explaining, "The whole thing is built around the arch." Not surprisingly, he used lasts of his own design (Model 100), and had them imported from Mexico, changing from Mexican ash to mesquite over time. The last generally served for seven years before being remade: "Our feet change all the time," he said. "If the customer gains—or loses—as much as 25 pounds, he must come in so I can take a new set of measurements for a new last." Charlie was particularly protective about his measurements and lasts: "There are some things I do that I won't even talk about because I don't want other bootmakers to know how it's done." In an oft-repeated pronouncement, Charlie summed up the importance of the last: "In bootmaking, the last comes first."

Occasionally, Charlie made boots without the opportunity to take measurements personally. He agreed to make Harry Belafonte a pair, but only if Belafonte made sure that the one taking measurements followed Charlie's "diagrammed instructions" exactly; Belafonte did as told, and loved the boots Charlie produced. In another case, an orthopedic surgeon could not come to Austin for a fitting. Charlie reluctantly agreed to work with him, but demanded x-rays, explaining " I want to see the bone structure." The emphasis on anatomy his art instructor instilled clearly took hold in Charlie. When he received the x-rays, Charlie saw the man's toes "just doubled up" on themselves. Upon receiving the finished boots, the client said "it was the first time in his life he ever had comfort in his feet," Charlie recalled. From Deacon Proudfoot, a Hells Angels president with no toes on his left foot, to Texas literary legend J. Frank Dobie, with two club feet – the only time Charlie, in a "life of bootmaking," had seen "double Lord Byrons," in Charlie's memorable description—people walked better with "Charlies" on their feet.

Tales of Charlie's works actually correcting foot problems abound. In one case, a pair of his boots "actually relieved a bone spur on a man's heel. Within a month after putting my boots on that fellow's bone spur had disappeared. Orthopedic surgeon wanted to operate. No need to after he put my boots on." Another man, "missing the front part of his foot" from dropping heavy machinery on it, asked Charlie to make him some boots. "He walked into the shop with a cane and put my boots on. When he left, he didn't need the cane anymore." As usual, Charlie had an answer: "I can fit 'em like a lot of 'em can't."

=== Construction ===
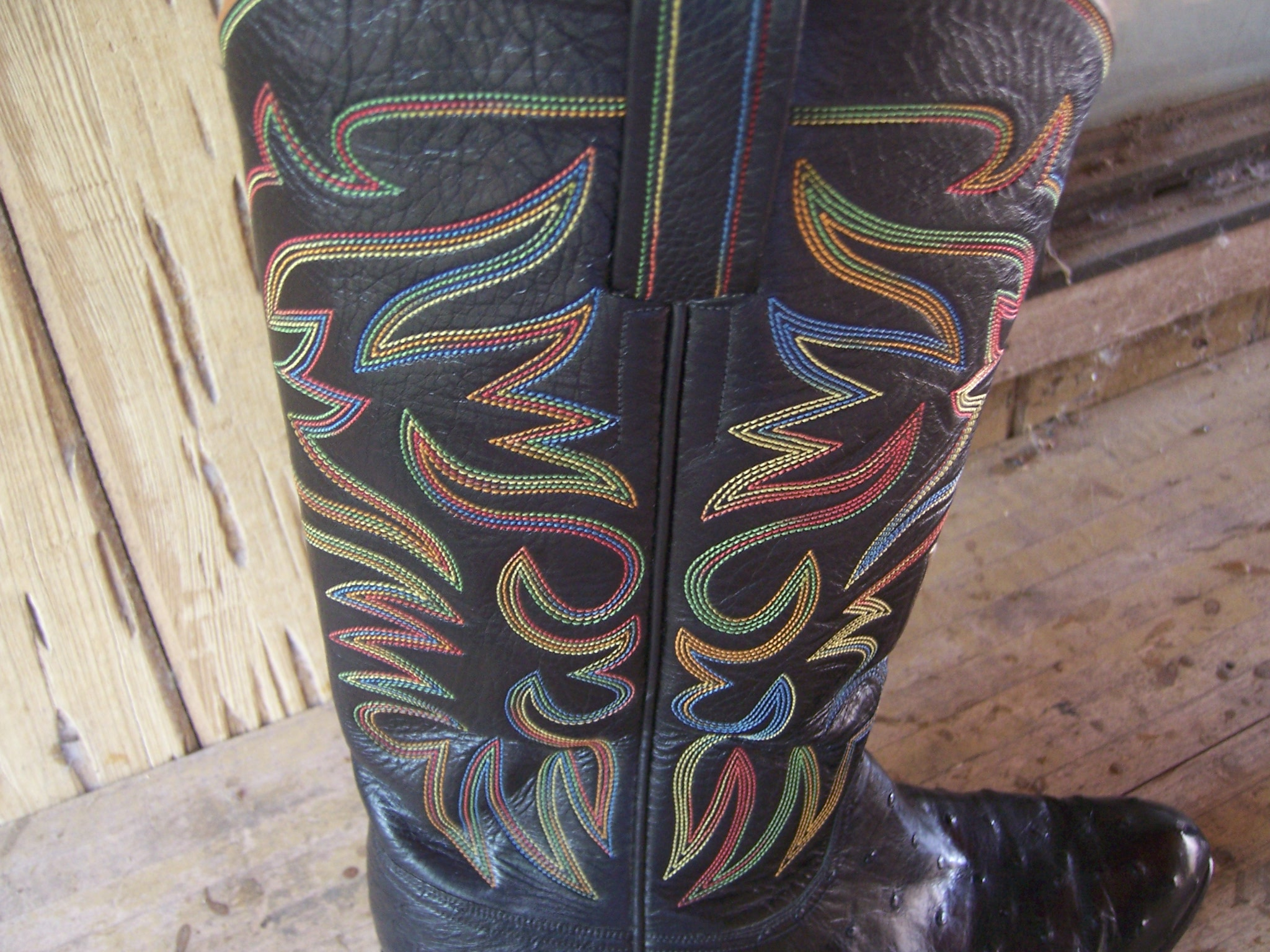
Close up of unique flaxen stitching.

For the fit to last, so to speak, the boot had to hold the shape. In the construction of the boot itself, as with the construction of the last, Charlie had some secrets. He drew on a lifetime of incorporating ideas and practices from the dozens of bootmakers with whom he worked and his own, constant effort to improve his practices. By the 1970s, something like a Charlie Dunn "code" for bootmaking had taken shape. Put simply, he made boots the old-fashioned way, never trying something new unless it improved the boot, and sometimes not even then, for he preferred the traditional way. This "code" had practices that were not negotiable for Charlie. The boot must have hard maple, not plastic or metal, pegs in securing various elements. He insisted on spinning his own flax threads for stitching and binding, though doing so took a long time to perfect and was expensive. Nylon thread, though sometimes more durable, was never used. Though almost every other bootmaker, including custom fitters, used plastic toe boxes as inserts to shape the toe of the boot, Charlie insisted on shaping them exclusively with leather boxes because they were tougher, could be built in almost any appropriate shape, and retained the tradition of bootmaking by hand. Where leather joined to leather, he skived, or thinned, both pieces to obtain a smoother, less abrasive seam, one that not only felt better to the wearer but also retained the lines of the boot. To provide support for the foot of the boot, Charlie used only iron spikes pounded flat by his hammer of 70+ years on his anvil affixed to a tree stump. For small men and women, he used a 40-penny spike; for larger men, he used a 60-penny spike, about six inches long and half-inch wide, known as a "bridge timber spike." And "The sole [has] got to be leather and got to be thick leather," and that's the way it was, for Charlie. These and other elements defined the Charlie Dunn "code" of making boots that had passed through the centuries of bootmaking, refined in his hands and on shop machines nearly as old as he was.

Charlie developed a method that respected bootmaker, boot, and client. While some elements of bootmaking came under "the code" and did not change, other practices did: He was constantly working to improve his boots. As cocksure as he was about his method, he was humble about the results in one respect: "Never was a pair of boots that couldn't have been made better," he often observed. SH Respecting the process of bootmaking itself, he noted, "I make a pair of boots, and the next time I try to make 'em a little better. I'll never reach perfection, but I have a hell of a [good] time trying." One way he kept trying to make them better was to listen to and watch bootmakers he respected. Charlie's long-time apprentice and eventual heir, Lee Miller, explained that while Charlie could draw the line at innovation and command "A boot has to be made like this," he also was "open, encouraging," and able to concede to changes if, and it always was a "big if" with Charlie, the suggestion improved the boot in the context of traditional bootmaking. A change in his use of hides illustrates Charlie's ability to recognize a better way of making custom boots.

For most of his lifetime of making boots, Charlie tried to get as many pairs of boots from a single hide as possible. After all, he had spent the better part of a century as an itinerant bootmaker, with limited access to hides, or working for budget-conscious owners, such as Buck Steiner, or for budget-minded clients, such as the Army, so the "old way" of using every square inch of a hide made sense—if he wanted to keep his job or sell his boots. And, for most of his career, Charlie had made working boots, not "fancy" boots. Miller, however, followed the old bootmaking saying of "No tits, tales, or assholes," that is, of avoiding the thinner, weaker, less attractive portions of the hide, because these parts were more likely to tear or stretch, and detracted from the appearance, as well. For the very expensive boots that Charlie made the last decade of his life, Miller argued that only the best portions of the hides should be used. At various times at Texas Traditions, one or the other, or both, men threatened to quit over the issue. At one point, Charlie folded his apron, set it on the workbench, and announced he was through. After a period inside the house, he returned to the shop, put on his apron, and resumed work. He was wrong, he admitted, and knew a better idea when he heard it.

The classic conflict and resolution between master and apprentice has occurred countless times in history in every field of human endeavor—how did Bach's or Michelangelo's or Louis Armstong's followers adhere to tradition, only to reinterpret it "faithfully"? How and when and to whom to pass the torch involves conflict, negotiation, and, eventually, a "new" tradition. So it was with Charlie and Lee Miller, in this and many other cases, as Charlie entrusted Miller with greater and greater responsibility for production. True, says Miller, "Charlie was kind of hands off. He expected you to do your work, which allowed me to flourish." There was, however, "never any doubt that [the shop] was Charlie's" and that it ultimately was "not a group effort... it was a Charlie Dunn boot."

Charlie made boots the best way he knew how—not the fastest (a pair required at least twenty hours, sometimes double, of "hand time," not counting fitting, curing, drying, and other pauses in the process); not the cheapest (nylon, plastic, and rubber cost less); and not the easiest (leather toe boxes and hand-spun flax thread took time and skill). The result? "A horse can step on my boots and they won't break down."

Charlie offered perfect fit and flawless construction to preserve that fit. But Charlie offered still more in his boots: unique designs of his or the client's choosing expertly integrated into the boot. With Charlie's boots, not just the fit was the owner's alone, so, too, was the design.

=== Design ===
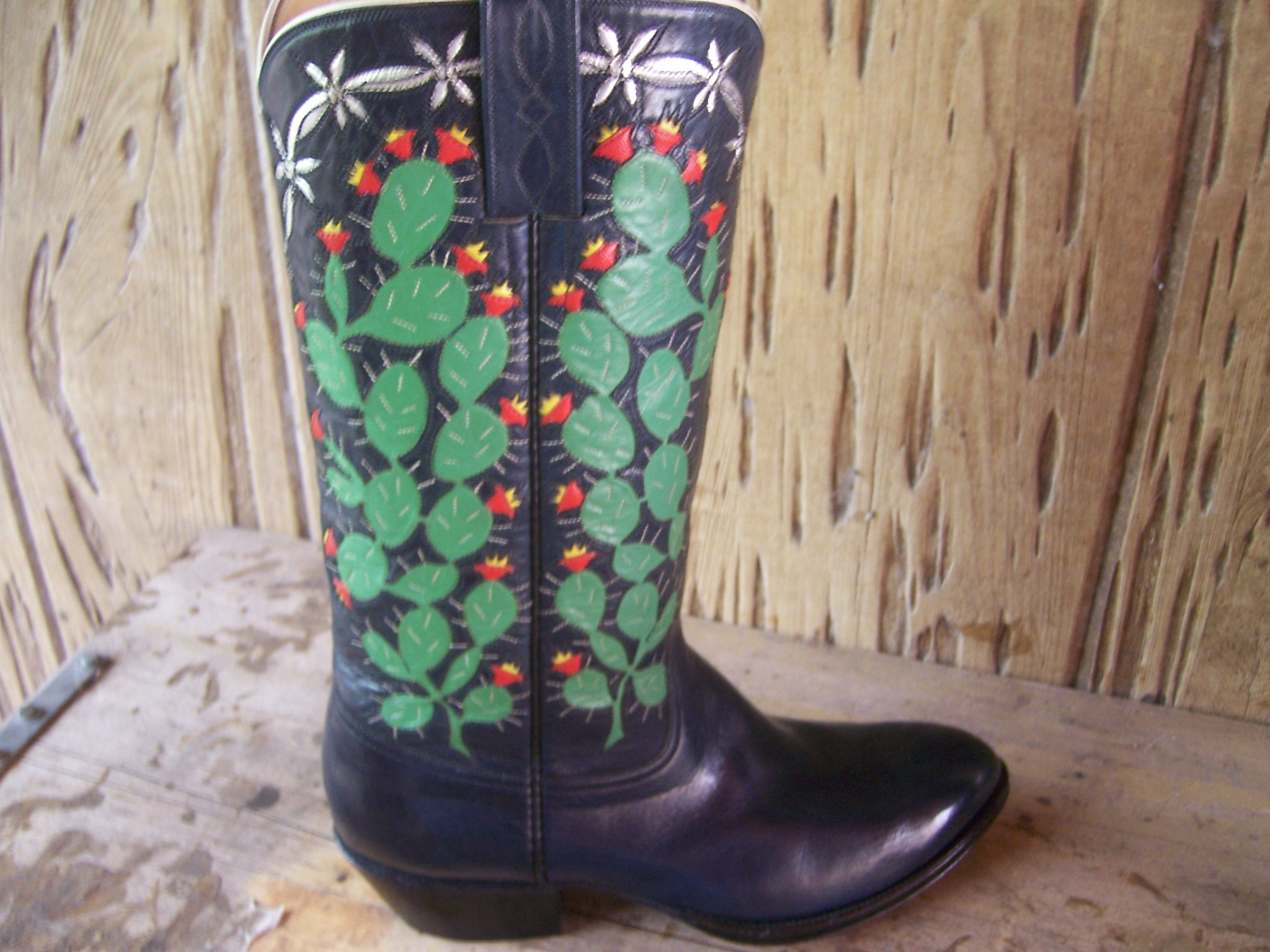
One of Charlie's best-known design elements was the prickly pear cactus. This boot also features barbed wire, unique to Charlie's boots.

Almost any design imaginable appears on a Charlie boot—oil derricks, animals, names, initials, logos, scenes, just about everything was sketched and worked into the upper and, less frequently, the lower foot. Charlie's signature design, dating to the pair he built "on spec" that Ernest Tubb bought, was the inlaid rose. It began, as did all of his creations, with a detailed sketch. He liked to work from life, so he used actual roses to inspire his design, and Charlie's immense artistic skill allowed the design to bloom. Drawing an intricate rose the size of a quarter is one thing; figuring how to create it out of leather, in-lay it in proportion on the boot, was quite another. So difficult and unique was this design, Charlie kept the process secret for decades, until he passed along the secrets to Miller.

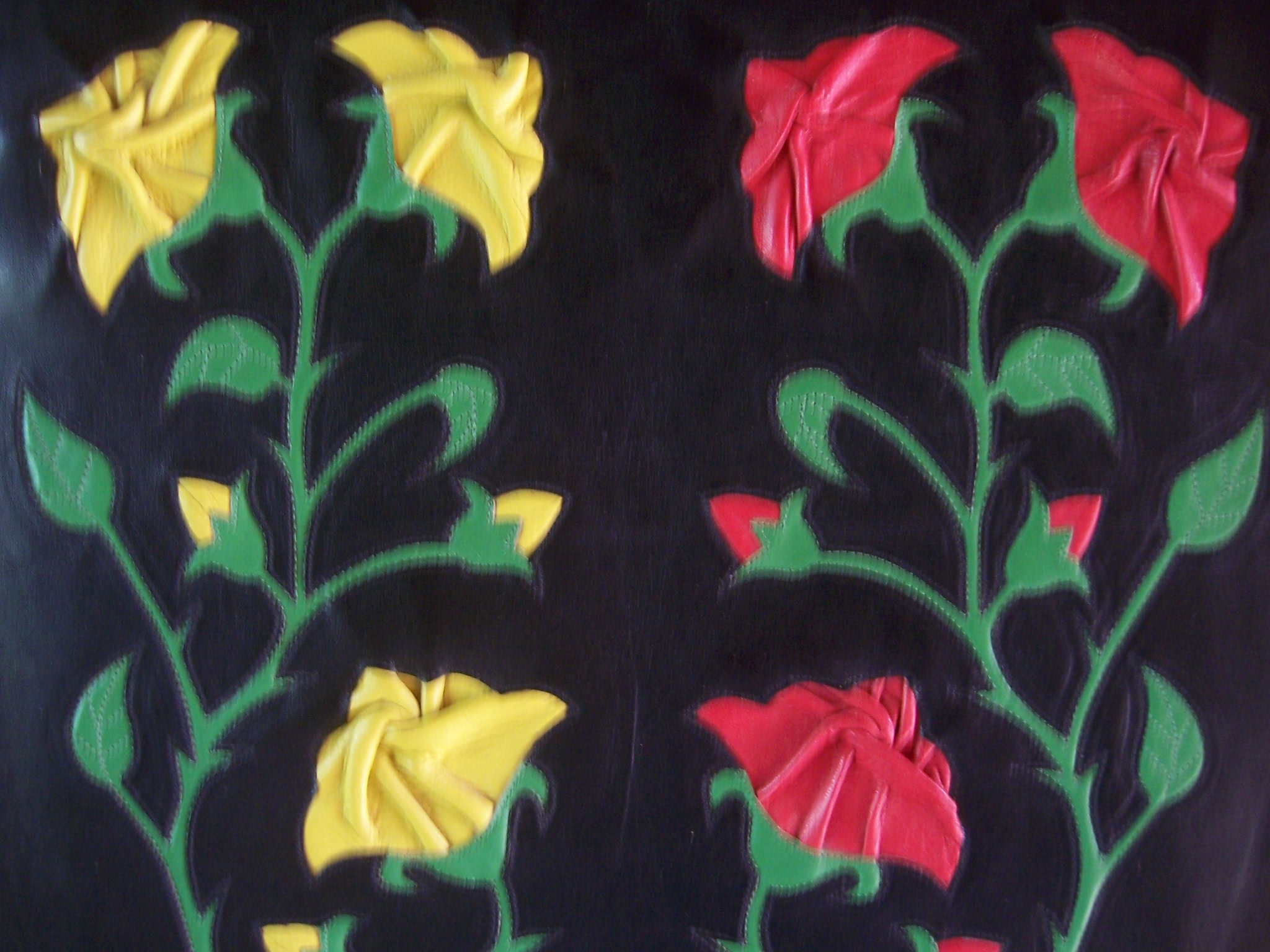
Charlie's inlaid roses were his trademark. Here he wove several into a sheet of leather.

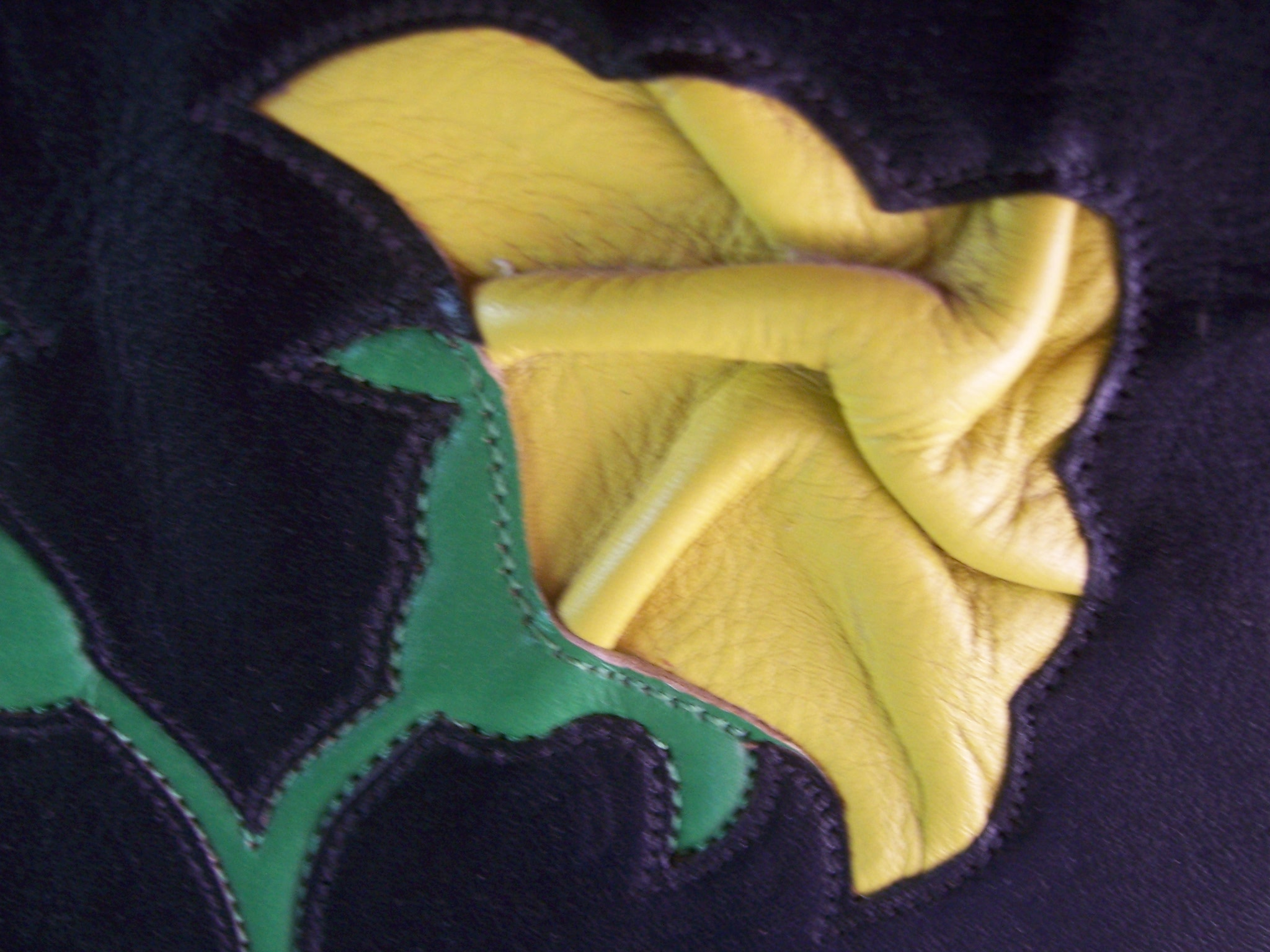
Perhaps the most requested design was the yellow rose featured here.

One client asked for bluebonnets to adorn his uppers, but Charlie hesitated because he didn't have one on hand to study. The client, a "real honest man" according to Charlie, soon showed up with the flower, a move that horrified him because he believed, as did most Texans, that it was illegal to pick the state flower! "I have to use a real bluebonnet or rose as my model," Charlie noted. "The bluebonnets and Indian paintbrushes only bloom outside in the spring, but I have a source that will give them to me all year 'round. A color photograph just isn't enough to help me capture them on leather." Whenever possible, Charlie, the artist, drew inspiration from the thing itself. Sometimes, however, he did not.

"One of my most popular motifs," recalled Charlie, was a marijuana leaf. While he agreed it "makes a beautiful design," in this rare instance a picture would do—"don't send samples, thank you." Presumably the same warning held for the "magic" mushrooms and peyote buttons that graced others' boots.

The most common motifs were the wearers' name or initials. Charlie teased, at $20 per letter (in 1977), "that's just cheap insurance against getting' 'em stolen." SL Charlie liked to make fancy or unusual designs "[b]ecause a lot of people can't make 'em like that," just as he liked to make boots for people "who say they can't be fit." His supreme confidence in fitting anybody carried over to his making of designs: "most other boot makers won't work" with initials or names or designs "because they're afraid they won't fit and they'll be stuck with them." Charlie refused payment for any boots that didn't fit, a rarity affecting only a handful of the thousands of pairs during his last decade of bootmaking. He adorned fearlessly.

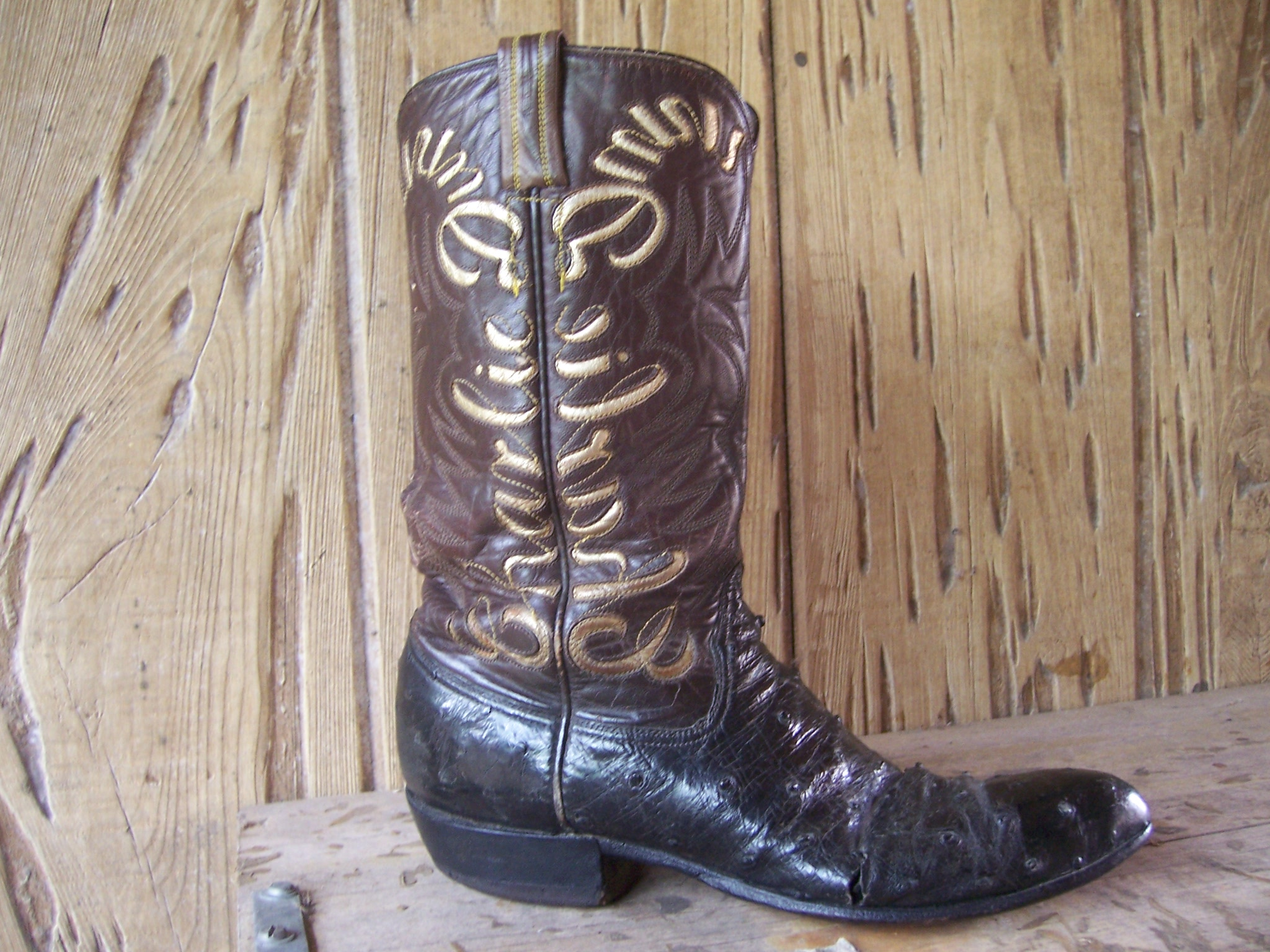
Text mirrored across the seam.

As Charlie's boots grew in popularity and expense, the palette and variety of exotic skins increased, too: ostrich, anteater, shark, alligator, sting ray, and others, in addition to the traditional calf, snake, lizard, and bull hides in a rainbow of hues. Charlie's favorite hide was kangaroo, because of its combination of strength and pliability, and his least favorite were shark and crocodile, with "skin as unpredictable as they were alive. You never know when it's going to break or give way," he explained. No matter how colorful or exotic the hide, regardless of the amount or type of designs, Charlie stayed true to his goal: "If you can't fit people, no matter how beautiful the boot is, no matter how exotic the leather, it ain't worth a damn."

In 1983 Charlie recorded a video showing the making of his kind of boot, explaining the process step-by-step. He shows the skiving, stitching, last-preparing, toe-boxing, and other features that make boots by him or those he taught so prized.

== The Charlie Dunn legend ==
Jerry Jeff Walker's song "Charlie Dunn" and the rise of the Austin music and counterculture scenes formed the first wave of Charlie's national prominence. A backlog of interest from his three-year retirement and an escalation in regional contraband profits backed his second wave of popularity. When he opened Texas Traditions, the first customer was Peter Fonda, followed quickly by a member of the Grateful Dead. Others who were lucky enough to be measured could wait several months for delivery, though the shop produced three or four pairs every week. Potential clients tried to bribe their way up the waiting list, offering as much as $500 in cash or even more in contraband. Demand became even more surreal with the release of "Urban Cowboy" (1980): Boot orders were backed up for a year, with more than 200 potential customers wanting the chance to wait 2 ½ years to be measured, though no new names were accepted for the waiting list. The price for a non-exotic pair had soared to $1000. "The high price was really more to discourage orders!" given the backlog, explained Miller.

If Charlie two-stepped to prominence with Jerry Jeff Walker's song, he now rode to mythic status with the urban cowboys. He was featured in national media, such as the TV shows "Good Morning America" and "Lifestyles of the Rich and Famous," and magazines such as "Travel & Leisure" and "Us." Even the increasingly reclusive Elizabeth Taylor sought his boots, writing by hand, "To Charlie. I need a pair of your beautiful boots. See you soon. Elizabeth Taylor." Charlie waited a year for her to come by, then lamented, "I wouldn't mind measuring her for hip boots. But any lady that would keep an 84-year-old man in suspense that long, I just don't know... There oughta be a law." He was known around the world, and probably had become the best-known maker of western boots the world has ever seen. For all the attention, however, Charlie remained humble about his artistry:

That song by Jerry Jeff Walker made people know me... And, of course, it made a whole lotta people want to buy boots from me. Some wanted comfort, others just wanted the – prestige you could say – of owning a pair of boots by Charlie Dunn. That's important for some people, I guess... prestige. None of my business why a person wants to own a pair of boots I made. But I do tell folks one thing: Boots by Charlie Dunn are made for walkin' with ease. Not for walkin' over people.

== Final retirement ==
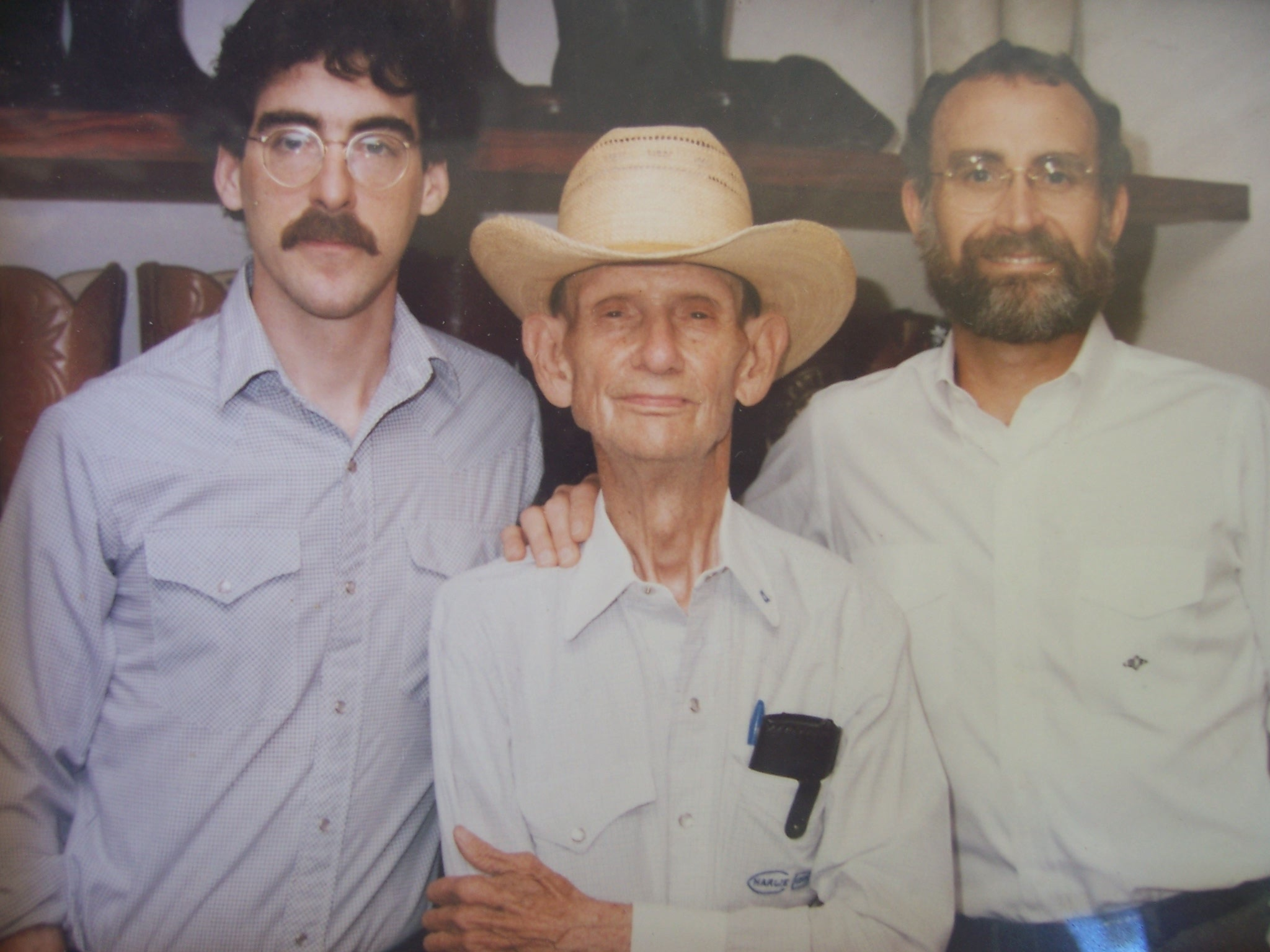
Lee Miller, Charlie, Don Counts on Charlie's 90th birthday.

Charlie retired from Texas Traditions, the shop he ran, on his 88th birthday, nine years almost to the day after he came out of his first retirement. He continued to live in the bungalow in front of the shop. When asked what he would say to someone asking if he would consider coming out of retirement a second time, Charlie snorted, "First I'll insult, then I'll shoot, them." Charlie had built up Texas Traditions since he started it, but did not own it. Don Counts, local physician and financial backer who had brought Charlie out of retirement, sold the business to Carrlyn and Lee Miller, though Counts retained the property. Miller received 3000 patterns, mostly of Charlie's designs, all of the ancient machinery, hides, and the immense good will created there. In return, Counts asked Miller to maintain the physical property, pay the taxes, and, most important to Counts and countless thousands since, to "carry on the tradition." Miller and Counts concluded the arrangements with a handshake. On his 90th birthday Charlie received several remarkable presents. The city of Austin declared September 19, 1977, "Charlie Dunn Day," noting that his "reputation for quality, perfect fit, and originality of design drew customers from all over the country." Also, for the first time his works were exhibited publicly in two venerable venues, Wylie's, the longest running bar on Austin's infamous 6th Street, and Clarksville Café, which stood in wealthy West Austin and the neighborhood of its former African-American servants. The exhibitions, titled "Texas Roots, Texas Boots," lasted for a month and featured boots from the 1940s forward. Further, Charlie was featured on a local public television program and in the local print media, as well.

Charlie soon moved to Thunderbird Lake outside Smithville, a small community an hour east of Austin. There he lived peaceably with a companion until he died from complications from a stroke on September 23, 1993. Charlie, 95, had made boots his entire life, save the first and last seven years of it.

Obituaries appeared nationwide via the AP wire. The New York Times noted that Charlie, "whose custom-made boots cost up to $3,000 and became a status symbol, rose to fame as a boot maker when Austin's music scene caught the nation's attention in the 1970's." It failed to mention his longevity as a bootmaker. He was buried in black kangaroo boots with six rows of multicolored stitching made. Miller, his heir, remembered, "I made them for him in 1991, and he said they were his favorites. He told me he liked them so much, he slept in them." At the funeral, Don Rountree, his grandson, and Lee Miller sang "Charlie Dunn" as Charlie was lowered into the grave. Many loyal clients gathered at his favorite restaurant afterward to swap stories and pay homage by wearing boots he had built.

== Legacies ==
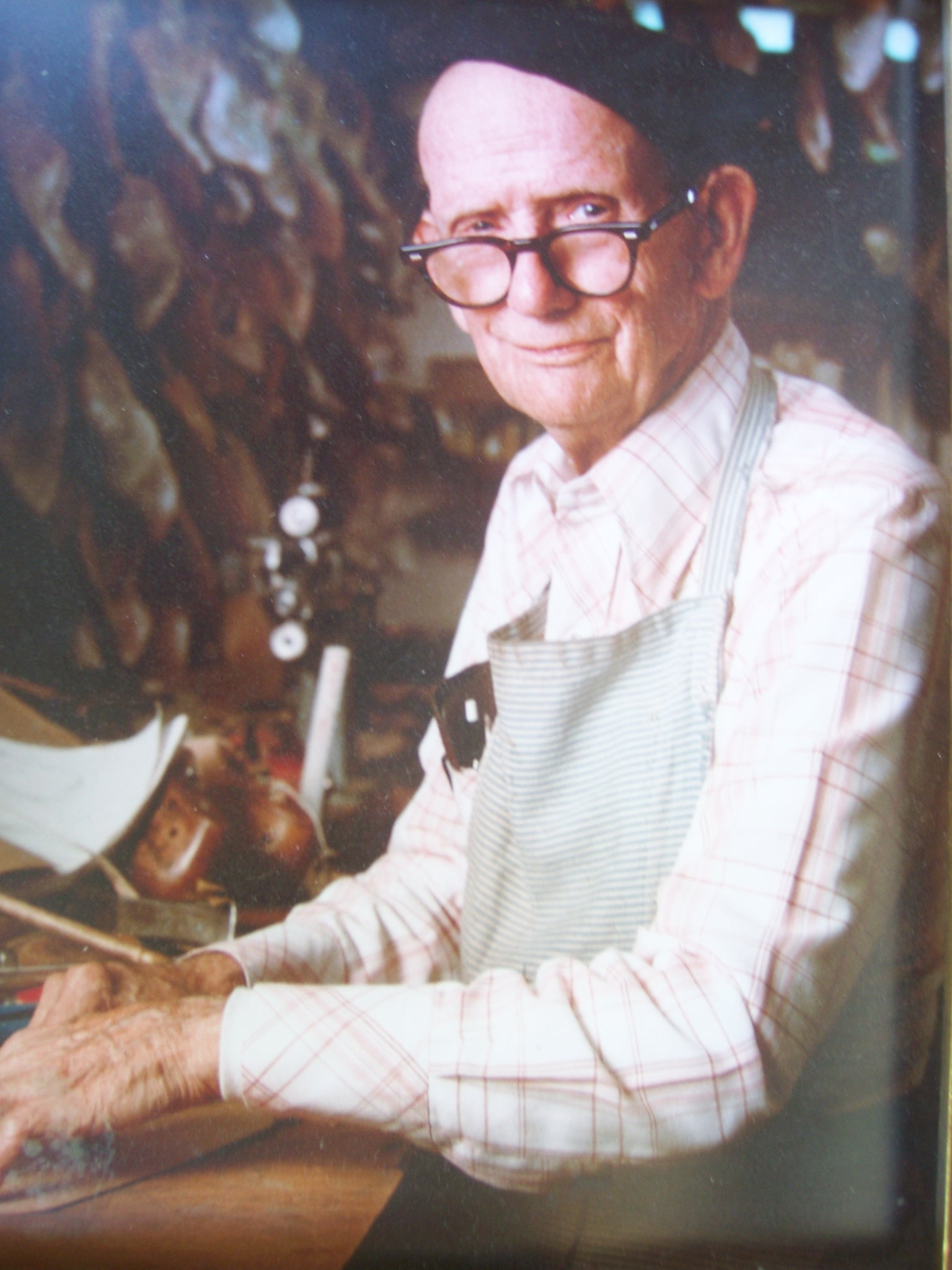
Charlie Dunn Making Boots. Photo courtesy of Don Counts.

Charlie had passed along to Lee Miller his most treasured secrets, including how to inlay the rose design, as well as his thousands of designs and lasts. Miller retained as the "tops man" Maximiliano ("Max") Fernandez, who had joined the shop during Charlie's watch. Miller has taken in apprentices and an intern, continuing the practice that brought him into Texas Traditions in the late 1970s. Commenting on the incredible unlikelihood of Charlie Dunn-style bootmaking still thriving in the 21st century, one apprentice remarked, "People don't do this anymore. In bootmaking you have to be lucky enough to find someone to teach you." She observed that the bootmakers coming in the wake of Charlie "have a legacy, and Lee [Miller] passes that down" to those he trains, just as he was trained. Miller explains, simply, that "You have to give back. And this is our giving back." Miller, Charlie's onetime apprentice, made the boots Charlie was buried in, his favorites.

When Don Counts sold Texas Traditions to Lee and Carrlyn Miller upon Charlie's retirement, he had only one condition: Miller had to agree to carry on the tradition of bootmaking taught him by Charlie. After all, Counts saw Texas Traditions as his own legacy, his vision brought to fruition, of preserving the Texas tradition of crafting hand-made boots. The thousands for whom Charlie made his exquisite "functional art" and hundreds more walking in his heir Miller's heritage creations and thousands yet to come, all can find comfort that the circle has not been broken, that in one small but important way, the 18th century has survived into the 21st.

Charlie Dunn has been called the "Michelangelo of Cowboy Boots". His former apprentice and bootmaking-heir-designate Lee Miller recalls that the beret-clad bootmaker “played the part of a Picasso.”
