= Chippewa Boots =

American footwear and rainwear company

- Company type: Subsidiary
- Industry: Footwear and rainwear
- Founded: 1901; 125 years ago
- Headquarters: Chippewa Falls, Wisconsin, United States
- Products: Boots
- Parent: Justin Brands
- Website: www.chippewaboots.com

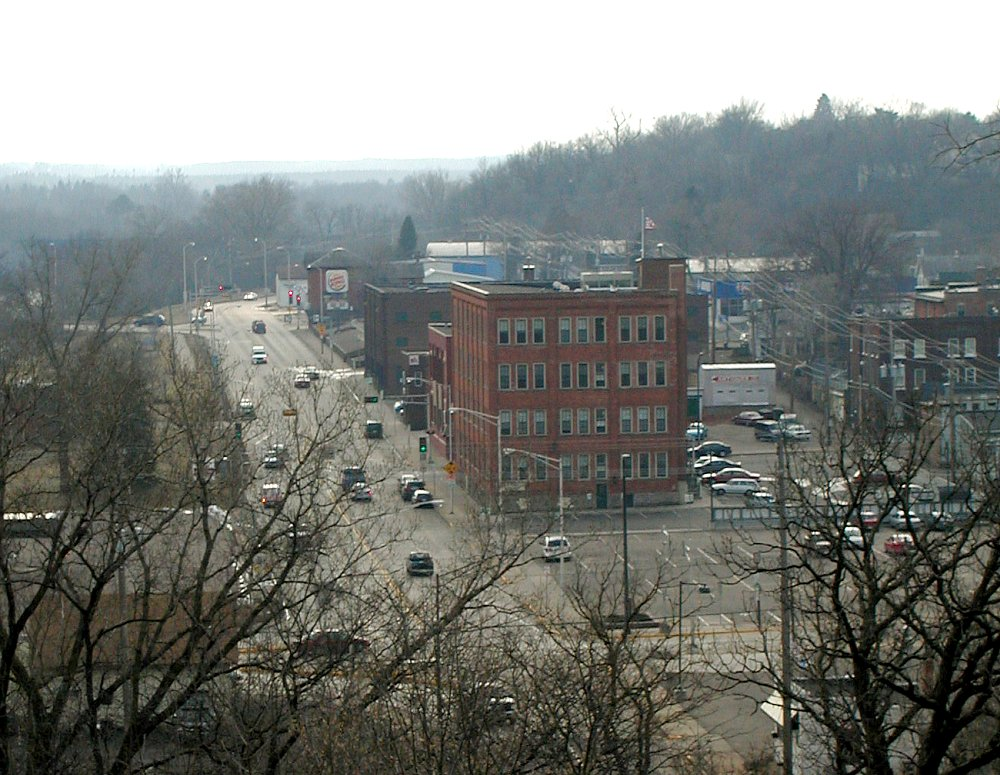
The Chippewa Shoe Manufacturing Company, now in the National Register of Historic Places.

Chippewa Boots, originally known as Chippewa Shoe Manufacturing Company, is an American manufacturer of footwear, principally men's work and recreational boots. It also manufactures a limited line of heavy and casual shoes, and some women's footwear. The name Chippewa is taken from the local Indian tribe in the region where the company was founded. It was founded in Chippewa Falls, Wisconsin, in 1901.

== History ==
Chippewa was founded in 1901 in Chippewa Falls, Wisconsin, USA. The company began their production at their early factory on River Street. Chippewa was the first to produce US-manufactured boots with Italian-made original vibram soles.

WW1 & WW2

During the first world war, Chippewa supplied boots to the military. This includes high quality foot wear for the Allied Powers in Europe and later for the US military when they joined the war on April 6, 1917. In the 1930s, the Wall Street crash and Great Depression led to the creation of programs like CCC and WPA to bolster America's infrastructure. To provide the new employees with new high quality boots, Chippewa innovated work boots, including the Engineer style boot, which it is credited with inventing.

During WWII, Chippewa crafted cold weather footwear for the US Army's elite 10th Mountain Division, adept in harsh terrains. Chippewa's Arctic Boots, with heel grooves for WWII ski bindings, honor these soldiers' legacy.

During the Cold War, Chippewa advanced cold weather technology, creating flight boots for the US Air Force. They developed the high-altitude flight boot worn by CIA pilots of the U-2 Spy Plane.

== Acquisition ==
In 1984, it was acquired by Justin Brands, which was in turn acquired by Berkshire Hathaway in August 2000. Other companies under Justin Brands include Justin Boots, Justin Original Workboots, Nocona Boots, and Tony Lama Boots.
