= Shaleton, New York =

Hamlet in New York, United States

Coordinates: 42°43′18″N 78°54′55″W

Shaleton is a former hamlet in the town of Hamburg in Erie County, New York, United States.

Originally known as "Weir's Crossing," the Acme Shale Brick Company built a plant in this area and developed the hamlet for its workers, when it took the name "Shaleton."
