= Nocona Boots =

American boot manufacturer

- Company type: Subsidiary
- Industry: Boots
- Founded: 1925; 101 years ago in Nocona, Texas, United States
- Founder: Enid Justin
- Headquarters: Fort Worth, Texas, United States
- Products: Boots
- Parent: Justin Brands
- Website: www.nocona.com

Nocona Boots is a western boot brand and a division of Justin Brands, a Berkshire Hathaway corporation (NYSE: BRKa).

Justin Brands is the world's largest manufacturer of western footwear. In addition to Nocona Boots, it owns Justin Boots, Tony Lama Boots, and Chippewa Boots.

== History ==
Nocona Boots was founded in Nocona, Texas, in 1925 by Enid Justin. She was the daughter of Justin Boots founder H.J. "Daddy Joe" Justin, who had begun boot-making in Spanish Fort, Texas in 1879. Cowboys ordered his custom-fit boots, which were ready to pick up after their cattle drives. In 1887, the railroad came through Nocona, and the boot factory moved there to take advantage of better shipping.

Enid started working in her father's shop at the age of 12 in 1906, where she remained for the next 12 years. After he died in 1918, other members of the family wanted to move the business to Ft. Worth. Enid felt so strongly her father wanted the company based in Nocona, she stayed behind when her brothers moved the factory's equipment to Ft. Worth in 1925. She borrowed $5,000 and kept seven employees to found the Nocona Boots brand.

The discovery of oil near Nocona brought many new customers. Nocona made a 16-inch lace-up boot tough enough to survive the oil fields, bringing the wildcatters back for more.

In 1981, Nocona Boots merged with Justin Industries, the then parent company of Justin Boots, bringing the two boot-making companies full circle. In 1999, the Nocona plant was shut down and production moved to El Paso, Texas.

== Today ==
Today, Nocona Boots still handcrafts premium cowboy boots offering collections in the Fashion, Legacy, Exotic, Western, Rancher and Competitor categories. The brand was also the first to offer cowboy boots officially licensed by The Collegiate Licensing Company, the College Boots Collection, handcrafted in the U.S.A. Nocona Boots footwear is available for men, women and children at western specialty stores across the country and online footwear retailers, including Zappos.

In November 2016, the city of Nocona learned that it would receive a $500,000 Community Development Block Grant from the Texas Department of Agriculture to help with costs to turn the original Justin Leather Goods building located at 100 Clay St. into a community activity center and farmers market.
