= Acme Boots =

American boot manufacturer

- Founded: 1929; 97 years ago in Chicago, Illinois, United States
- Founders: Jessel and Sydney Cohn

Acme Boots was the name of a company that produced boots. It eventually just became a brand name, and was last owned by H.H. Brown, until it was placed under their Double-H Boots brand label.

== Etymology ==
Acme (ακμή; English transliteration: akmē) is Ancient Greek for "(highest) point, edge; peak of anything", being used in English with the meaning of "prime" or "the best", initially when referring to a period in someone's life and then extending to anything or anyone who reaches perfection in a certain regard.

== History ==
During the Great Depression, two Chicago shoe manufacturers, Jessel Cohn and his son, Sidney, decided to move their children's and infants' shoemaking plant from Chicago, Illinois, to Clarksville, Tennessee. They set up their business in a two-story brick building on Crossland Avenue and called it the Acme Shoe Manufacturing Company. They hired 100 employees and began producing sandal-like footwear for children and infants under the name Just-Kids. The Cohns continued their children's business until 1935, when the senior Cohn returned home from a business trip to Texas. Shortly after, the Cohns dropped their children's footwear line in favor of making western boots and renamed the company Acme Boots. In the 1940s, Acme Boots became the largest maker of cowboy boots and remained the world's largest until the mid-1980s.

Acme Boots has since been held by various corporations, including Arena Brands of Dallas, Texas, which licensed the Acme Brand to the Texas Boot Company of Lebanon, Tennessee, in 2000. In 2002, Texas Boot put the Acme Boot brand up for sale, where it was purchased by H.H. Brown, a subsidiary of Berkshire Hathaway, and placed under the Double-H Boots brand label, where it remains today.
