= Cavalier boot =

Style of European boot

Cavalier boots are a style of boot that were popular in Europe between approximately 1500 and 1700. They are soft knee-high leather boots typically made of brown calfskin.

== Origins ==
Thigh high riding boots were first worn with buff coats by gentlemen and soldiers during the mid-Tudor period. By the reign of Elizabeth I these had low heels to facilitate riding and were made of soft brown leather.

== Jacobean period ==
By the reign of James I boots had replaced shoes as the most popular footwear among the upper classes, who often wore them indoors, even with spurs. By the 1620s they resembled the boots worn by the Three Musketeers, with a flared bucket-shaped top and high wooden heels similar to those on cowboy boots.

== Military use ==
Boots of this type are stereotypically associated with the dashing Cavalier of the English Civil War but in reality many Roundheads, including the Earl of Essex, dressed identically to the Royalists. Cavalier boots remained in use among cavalry until the late 18th century when they were replaced with the Hessian boots popularised by Prussian king Frederick the Great.

== Maritime use ==
Cavalier boots are often associated with pirates and highwaymen like Dick Turpin or Captain Blood. These tall boots were prized by helmsmen and naval officers as they provided excellent protection from rain and spray. Boots of this design, worn with a Sou'wester and oilskins, remained in use among fishermen well into the 20th century when they were replaced with rubber Wellington boots and waders.

== Revival ==
Cavalier boots underwent a revival during the American Civil War when flamboyant cavalry officers like George Armstrong Custer and Jeb Stuart purchased thigh-high riding boots. Following the successful Pirates of the Caribbean films boots of this type have also become popular among young British women.

== Gallery ==
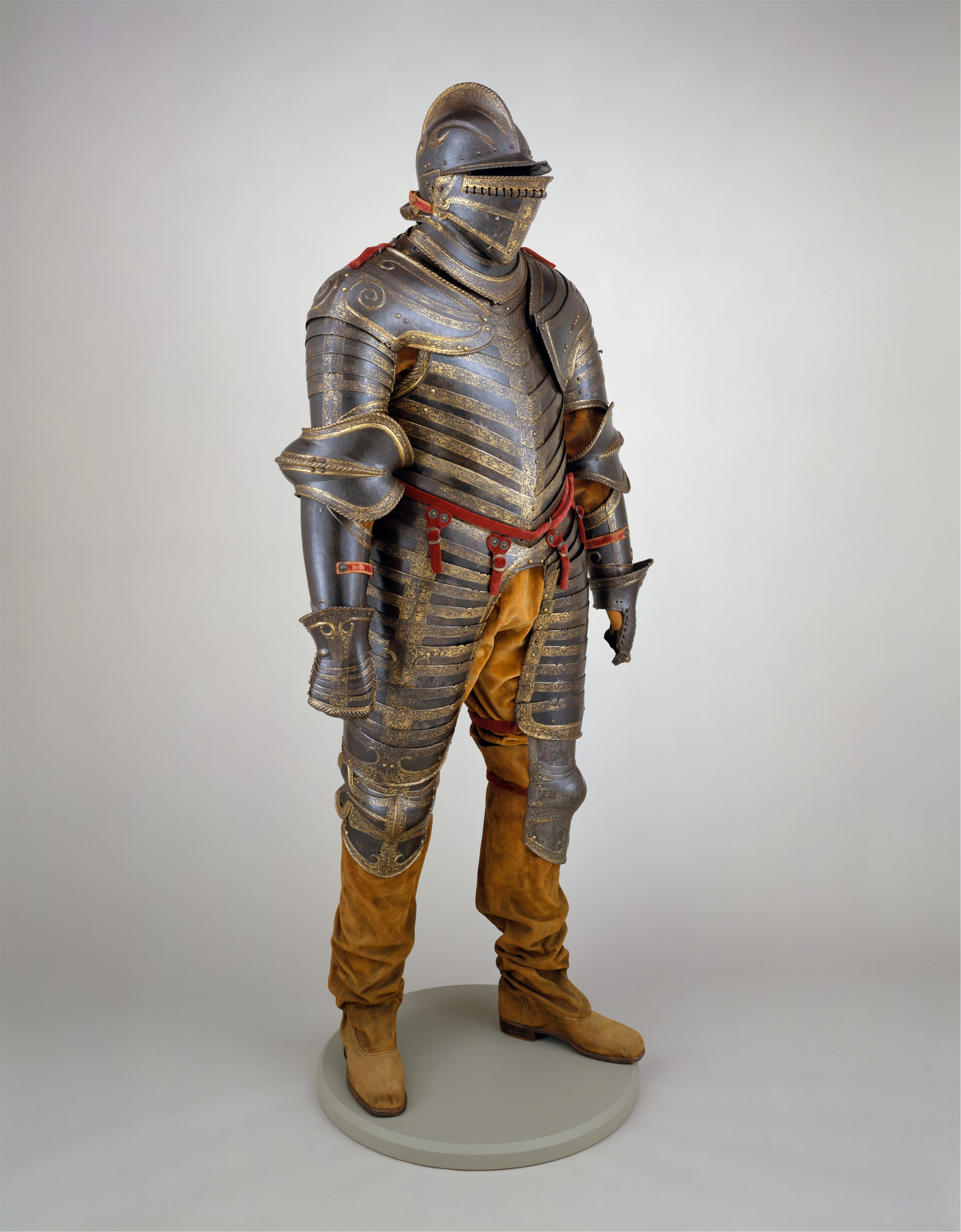
This c.1544 suit of cuirassier armor belonging to Henry VIII includes a pair of low-heeled cavalier boots.

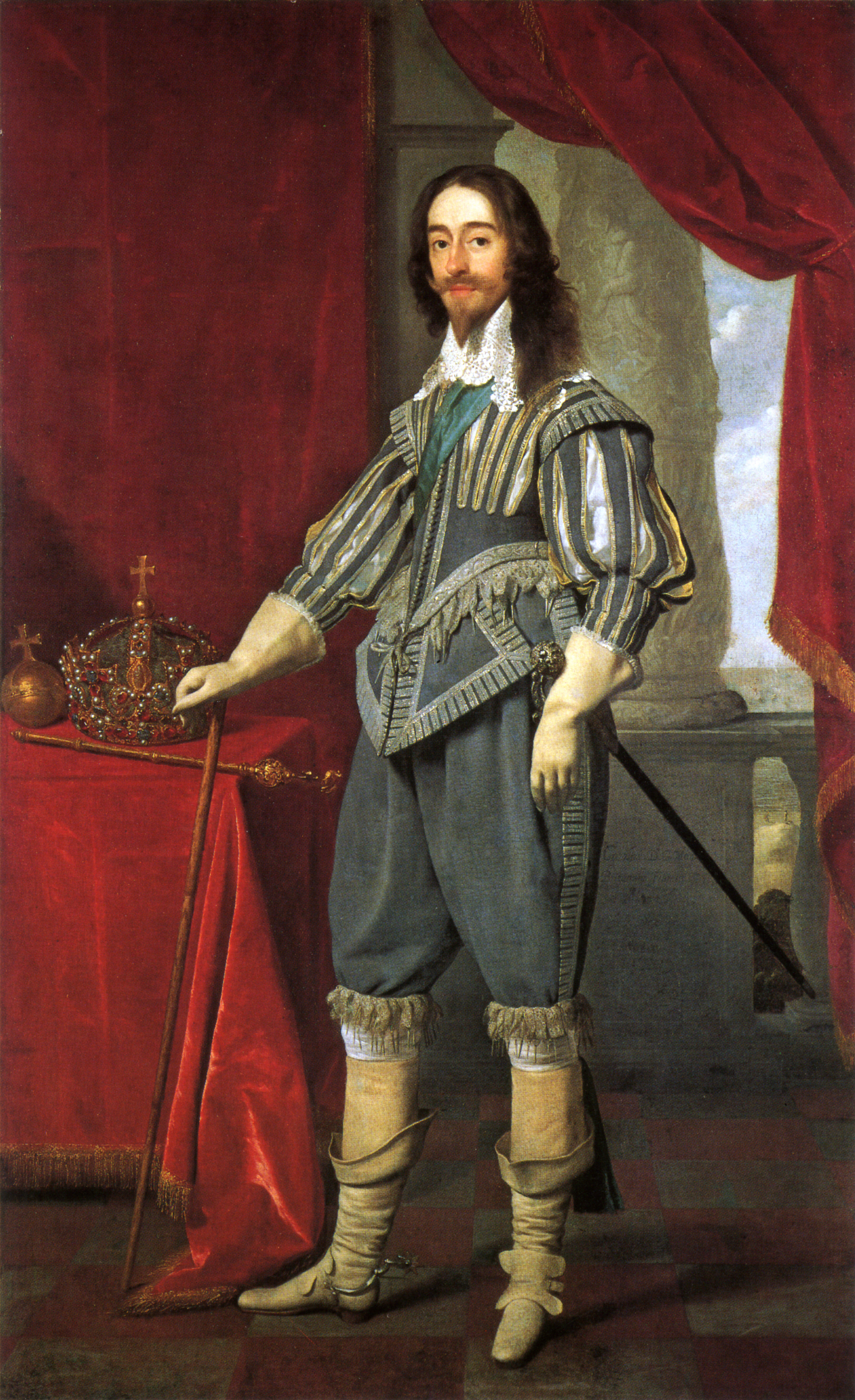
King Charles I wearing Cavalier boots

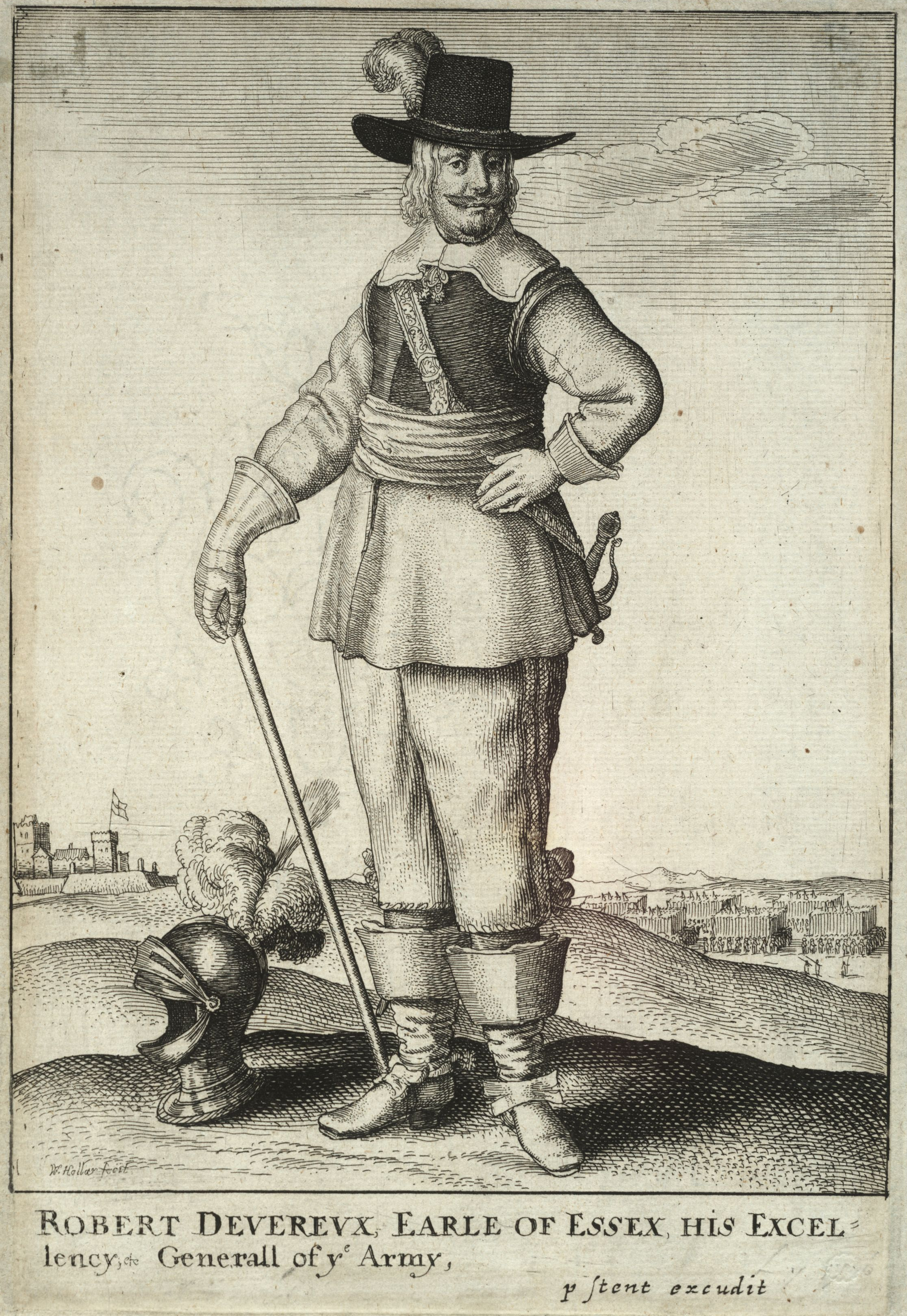
Bucket-topped boots, buff coat and cuirass worn by Roundhead commander Robert Devereux, 3rd Earl of Essex, circa 1642

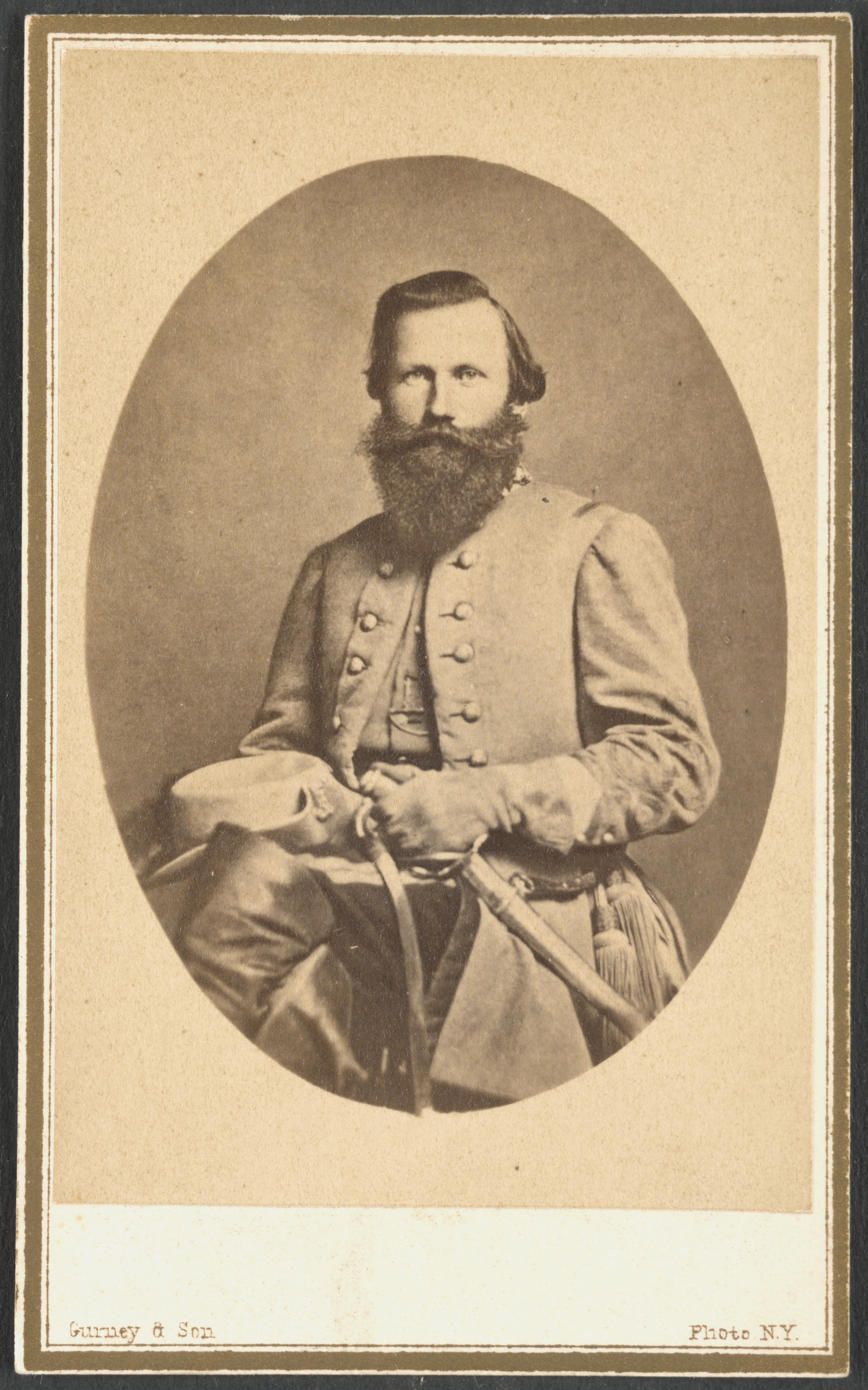
Confederate cavalry officer Jeb Stuart, well known for his flamboyant costumes

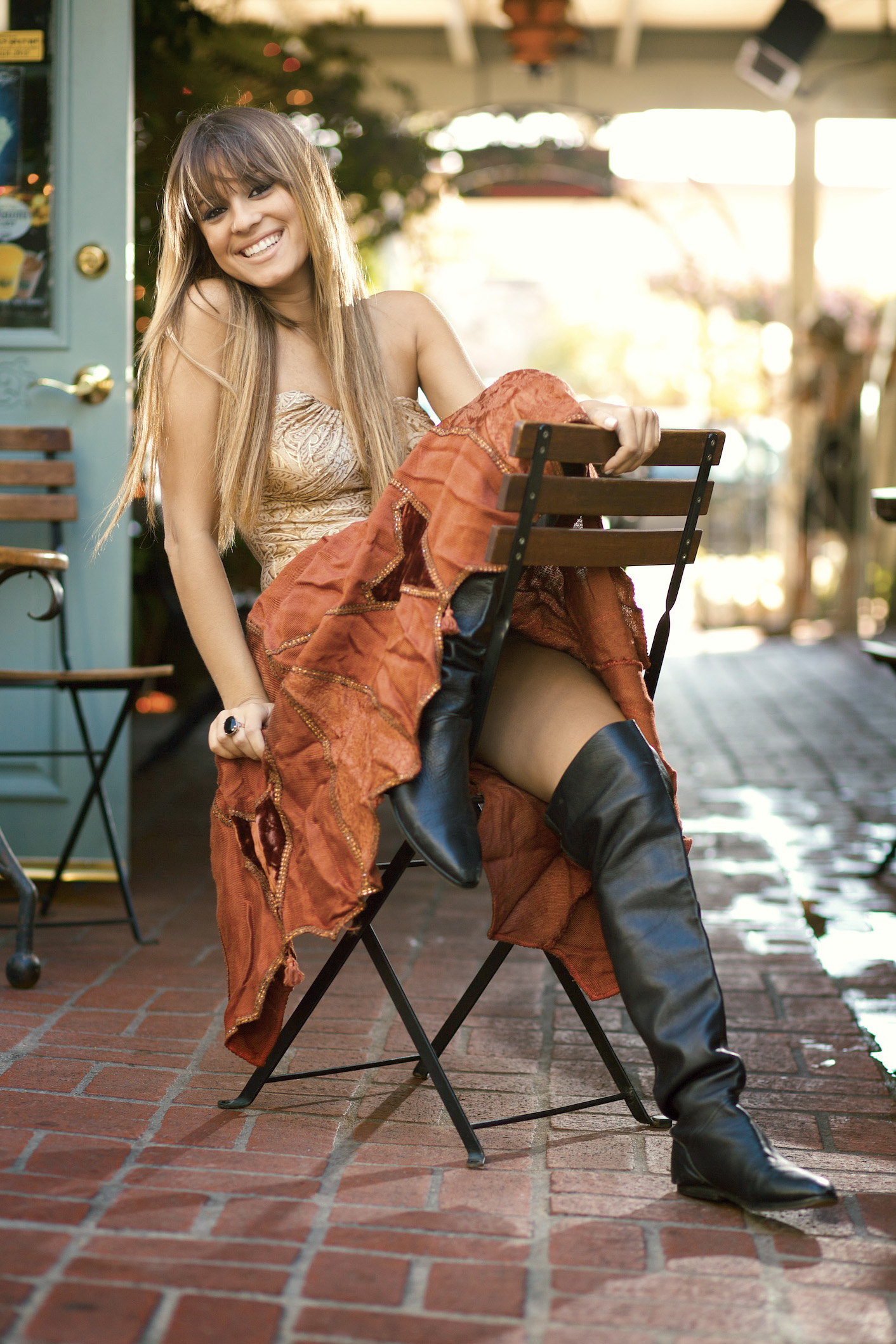
Young woman wearing a pair of "pirate boots," 2008

== See also ==
- 1550–1600 in fashion
- 1600-1650 in fashion
- List of shoe styles
