= Double-H Boots =

American footwear manufacturer

- Company type: Subsidiary
- Industry: Retail
- Founded: 1955; 71 years ago, in Richland, Pennsylvania
- Headquarters: Martinsburg, Pennsylvania, United States
- Products: Cowboy boots; Work footwear
- Parent: Berkshire Hathaway
- Website: www.doublehboots.com

Double-H Boots manufactures western footwear. It is owned by H.H. Brown, a wholly owned subsidiary of Berkshire Hathaway.

== History ==
Double-H Boots was founded in 1955 in Richland, Pennsylvania. The original factory location was an area shoe company that had other facilities in the Reading area and had no future needs for the plant in Richland. The H.H. Brown Shoe Company purchased the building, looking for a location to manufacture western footwear.

The Richland facility was named the Richland Shoe Co. and began producing cowboy boots and work footwear. Shortly after production, a competitor introduced a new style called a "harness boot." H.H. Brown introduced a similar product called a "snoot boot" and made it at Richland Shoe for a lower cost. For many years, it was almost the total production of the Richland plant. Richland shared sales personnel with the Carolina Shoe Company and for some time had a single sales manager. The western side at Richland continued to grow and a separate sales force and management was created.

By the 1970s, western boots had become the majority of boots produced. The Richland plant was the first in the United States to manufacture western boots with a safety toe, the first boots to pass the now standard Class 75 ANSI tests for safety footwear. When computerized fancy stitch machines hit the shoe market, the line expanded into the dress western boot business. In 1981, it was necessary to expand again. A facility was located in Womelsdorf, Pennsylvania, that was large enough for manufacturing and warehouse space. In 1993, the name was changed to Double-H Boots to reflect the company heritage of H.H. Brown.

In 1991, Berkshire Hathaway acquired H.H. Brown.

In 1995, Double-H debuted the Sonora line of western inspired fashion footwear for women. Sonora is a seasonal fashion line with launches twice a year.

In 2001, Berkshire Hathaway merged Dexter shoes with H.H. Brown.

In the spring of 2002, Double-H Boots purchased the Acme Boot Company and rolled out a new line of men's, women's and children's boots under the Acme name.

Double H. Boot Co.'s plant in Womelsdorf closed its doors in June 2007, leaving 135 workers jobless. Production of the majority of the work and dress western style boots was then transferred to the company's larger production facility in Martinsburg, Blair County, Pennsylvania. The casual and fashion lines of Double-H are produced overseas.

Double-H had a business relationship with the Professional Bull Riders (PBR) that started in 1997 and lasted through 2008, sponsoring the organization and some of its bull riders. Double-H was also affiliated with national and local rodeo associations and events.
