= Cowboy boot =

High-heeled leather riding boot

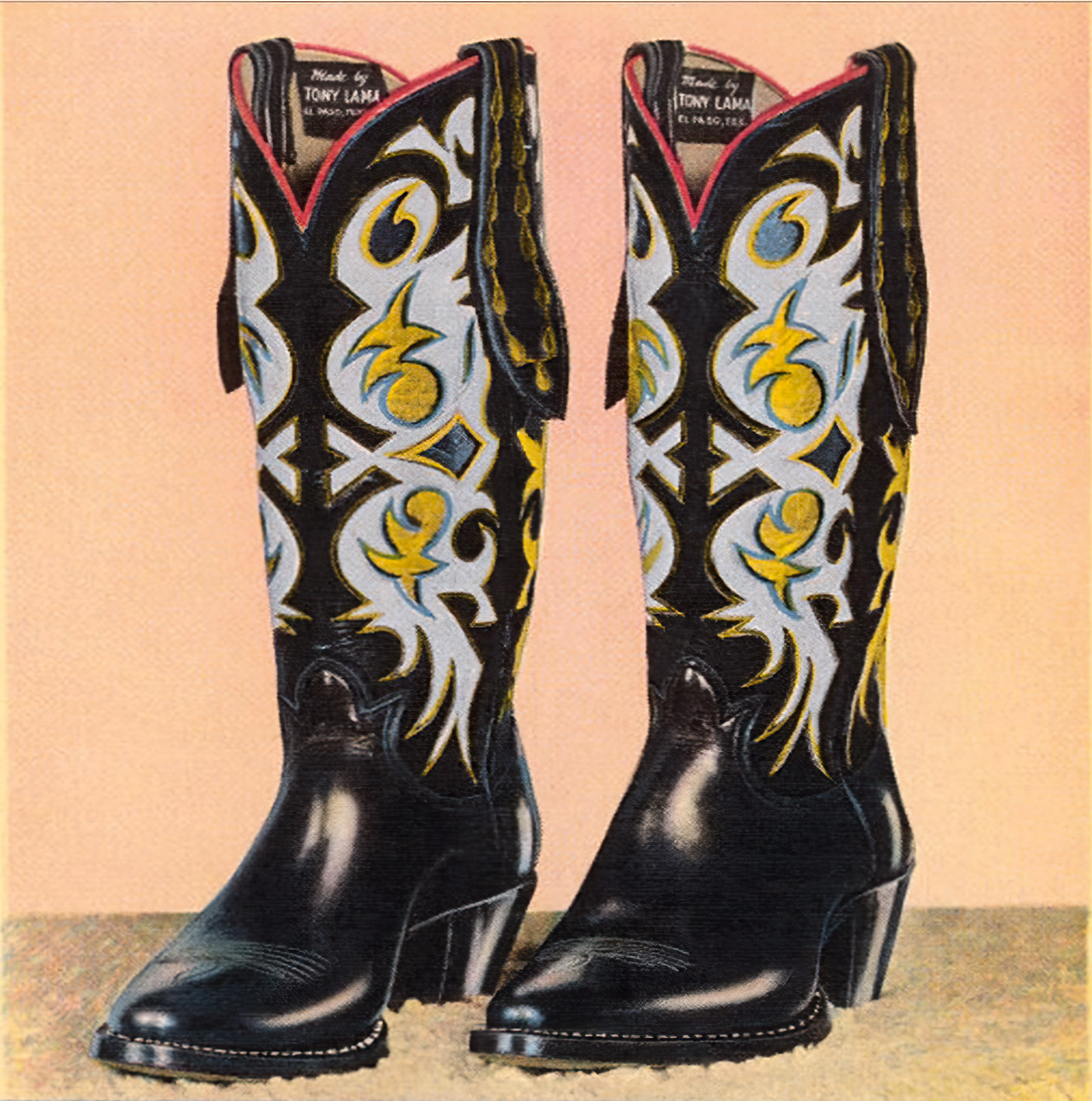
Cowboy boots custom made for President Harry S. Truman by Tony Lama Boots

Cowboy boots are a specific style of riding boot, historically worn by cowboys. They have a high heel that is traditionally made of stacked leather, rounded to pointed toe, high shaft, and, traditionally, no lacing. Cowboy boots are normally made from cowhide leather, which may be decoratively hand-tooled, but are also sometimes made from "exotic" skins like alligator, snake, ostrich, lizard, eel, elephant, stingray, elk, American Bison, and so on.

There are two basic styles of cowboy boots, western (or classic), and roper. The classic style is distinguished by a tall boot shaft, going to at least mid-calf, with an angled "cowboy" heel, usually over one inch high. A slightly lower, still angled, "walking" heel is also common. The toe of western boots was originally rounded or squared in shape. Some claim that the narrow pointed-toe design appeared in the early 1940s, although it can be seen as early as 1914 (see photo of Lottie Briscoe at right).

The "roper" style is a newer design with a short boot shaft that stops above the ankle but before the middle of the calf, with a very low and squared-off "roper" heel, shaped to the sole of the boot, usually less than one inch high. Roper boots are usually made with rounded toes, but styles with squared toe correlate with style changes in streetwear. The roper style is also manufactured in a lace-up design which often fits better around the ankle and is less likely to slip off. Still, lacing also creates safety issues for riding. They usually have some decorative stitching.

== History ==
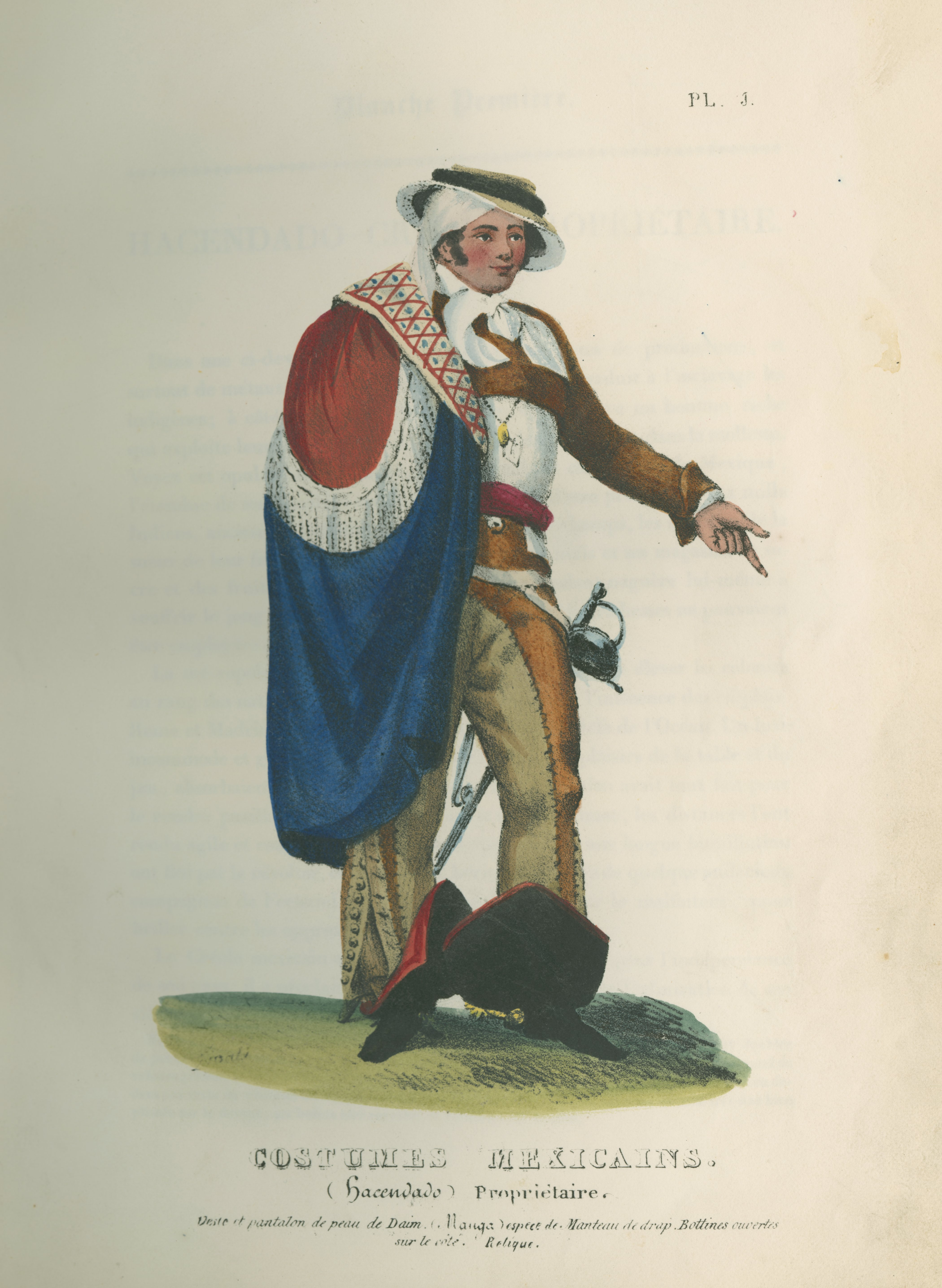
A Mexican landowner (hacendado) wearing botas de ala or “winged boots” (1828).

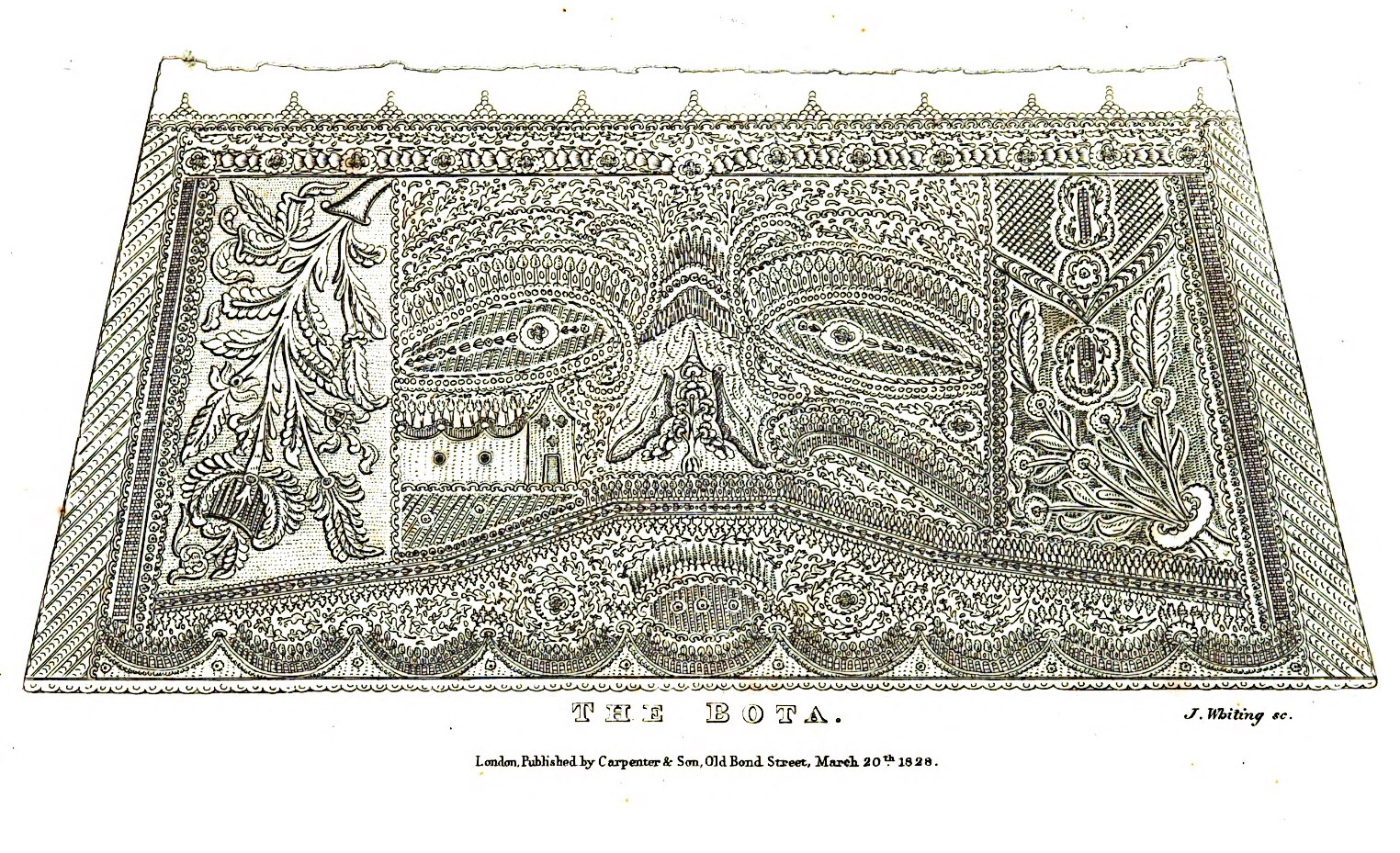
Sketch of an unrolled Bota de Campana, also known as Bota Vaquera, showing the intricate designs (1828).

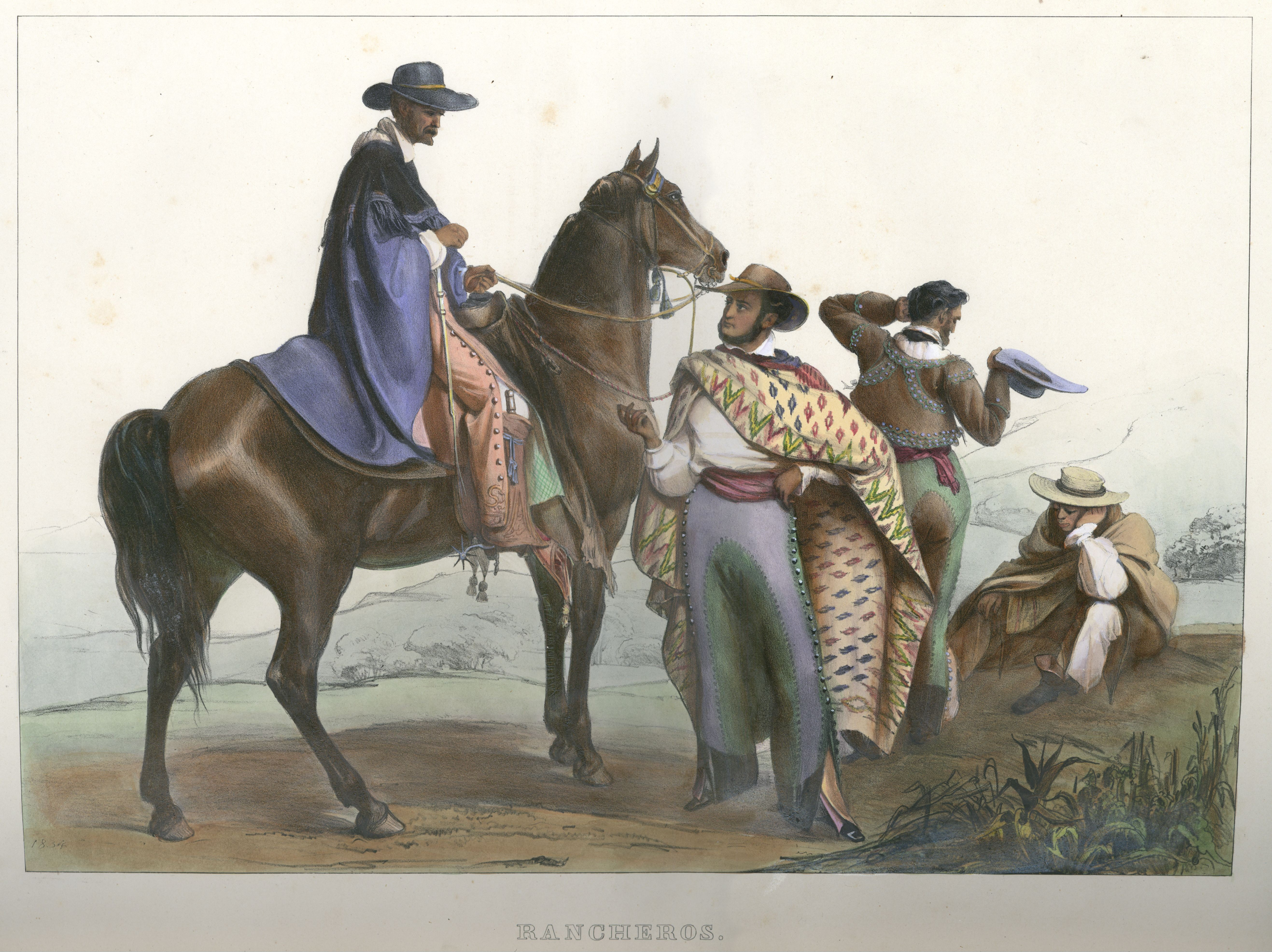
The ranchero on horseback wears botas de campana or botas vaqueras; notice the handle of his dagger sticking out of the bota (1834).

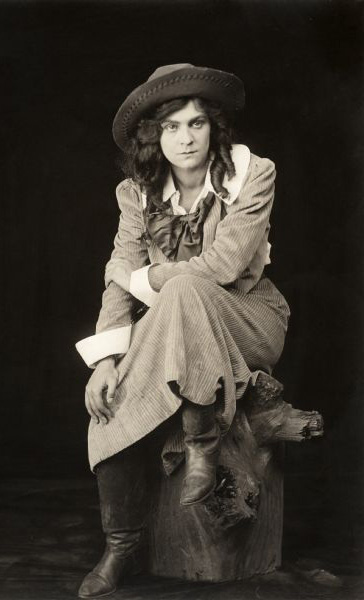
Lottie Briscoe in 1914 wearing cowboy boots

Riding boots had been a part of equestrian life for centuries. Until the industrial age, boots were individually handmade in many different styles, depending on the culture. Early cowboy boot designs, along with other cowboy accoutrements, were also heavily influenced by the vaquero tradition that developed from a tradition that originated in Spain to the Americas, dating back to the early 16th century. The boots worn by Mexican vaqueros influenced cowboy boots, although the exact origin of the modern cowboy boot as we know it today is unclear. It has been suggested that during the 16th century, horsemen in Mexico wore cavalier boots, specifically those involved in the Chichimeca War, the majority of which were herdsmen (vaqueros). In the 18th century, many Mexican horsemen used a flat, heel-less shoe of indigenous origin, made of leather, called teguas and, to protect the calves, a set of leather or cloth polainas or gaiters.

In 19th century Mexico, the zapato de ala (winged shoe) or bota de ala (winged boot) came into use; a type of leather, heel-less ankle boots with the sides of the opening or shaft protruding to the sides. Wrapped around each calf, on top of the botas de ala, being covered almost entirely by them, the Mexicans wore their botas de campana or botas campaneras, a set of thick, deer or goatskin, leather wraps, intricately embossed and tied right below the knee by laces known as ataderos. When worn, they gave the impression of being bells or bell-bottoms, hence the name “botas de campana” or “campaneras”, meaning “bell boots”. Botas de campana were also known as botas vaqueras or cowboy boots and within the folds, securely fastened, the Mexican Charros carried a knife or dagger, in easy reach when needed, specially when they needed to free themselves from enemy lassos. Some were made out of buffalo skin; the most expensive and sought after botas de campana were those made in Guadalajara, lined with gold or silver and silk ataderos. In the advent of Mexico’s Independence and the opening up of the country to foreign trade in 1821, the wealthy Mexican horsemen were introduced to the Hessian or Wellington boots, but the majority continued using the botas de campana and botas de ala. But by the 1870’s both traditional boots were falling into disuse, and by the end of the century were long forgotten. Towards the end of the 19th century and early 20th century, the Mexican rancheros were generally wearing a type of Wellington boot, known by the Mexicans as botas federicas, later becoming known as botas jaliscas in the 20th century, which are now mainly used by females in Escaramuza charra. They also wore boots that merged or combined the designs of all three previous types, retaining the intricate designs of the botas de campana.

Americans most likely adopted some aspects of these types of boots via Northern Mexico, with military boots designed for cavalry riders probably also having an influence, thus giving birth to the cowboy boot. The original boot called “cowboy boot” was specifically from Texas and was seldom seen east of the Mississippi. They were extremely tight fitting, peaked boots made of leather, with narrow soles, an eight inch leg and an extraordinarily high heel, partly to prevent the foot from slipping through the stirrups; the boots were what the cowboys were most proud of.

During the cattle drive era of 1866–1884, the cowboy was apt to ruin a good pair of dress boots while working, so some owned more decorative dress boots to wear in town. The basic style elements permeated working boots as well. Fashion magazines from 1850 and 1860 show the cowboy boot with top stitching, geometric or other natural elements cutouts, and underslung heel.

The American-style boot was taken up by bootmakers in the cattle ranching areas of Texas, Oklahoma, and Kansas. Two of the best-known early bootmakers of the era were Charles Hyer of Hyer Brothers Boots in Olathe, Kansas, and H. J. "Daddy Joe" Justin of Justin Boots in Spanish Fort, Texas and later Nocona, Texas. After Justin moved to Fort Worth, where shipping was easier, the Nocona brand of cowboy boots was made by Enid Justin Stelzer, eldest daughter of H. J. Justin, who stayed in Nocona with her husband, and the couple continued the family business. After the couple divorced, the Olsen-Stelzer brand was started by Stelzer. The Texas Legislature designated the cowboy boot as the official "State Footwear of Texas" in 2007.

T.C. McInerney of Abilene, Kansas, also made the American-style cowboy boot. A picture of this boot is listed in an ad in the Abilene Weekly Chronicle on December 7, 1871.

== Design ==
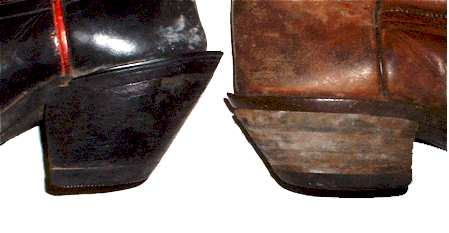
Comparison of the "cowboy" heel and the lower "walking" heel. Both designs are angled slightly, different from the squared-off "roper" heel

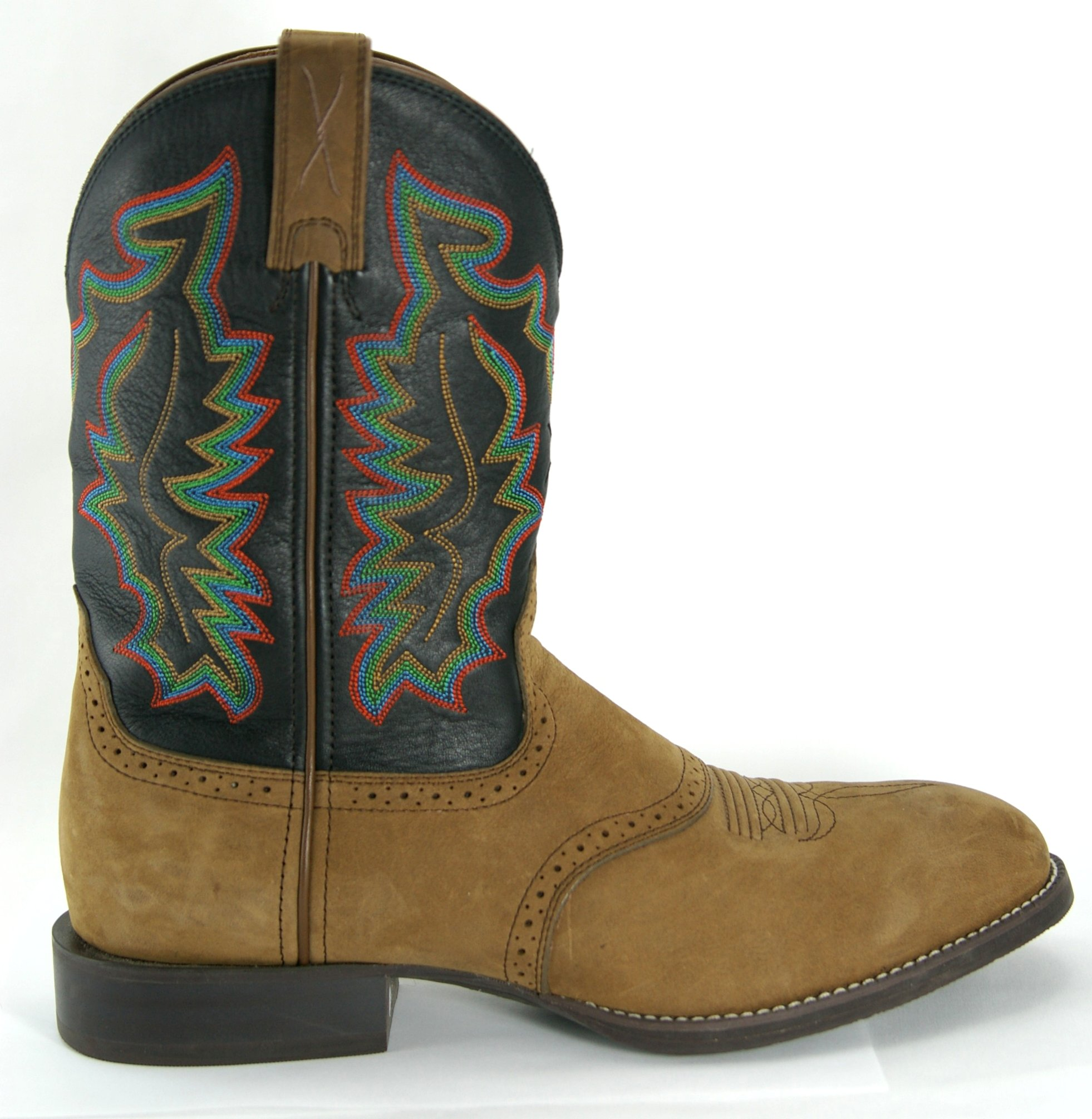
A roper-style cowboy boot has a low, squared-off heel

When mounting and, especially, dismounting, the slick, treadless leather sole of the boot allowed easy insertion and removal of the foot into the stirrup of the Western saddle. The original toe was rounded and slightly narrowed at the toe to make it easier to insert. While an extremely pointed toe is a modern stylization appearing in the 1940s, it adds no practical benefit and can be uncomfortable in a working boot.

While in the saddle, the tall heel minimized the risk of the foot sliding forward through the stirrup, which could be life-threatening if it happened and the rider was unseated. There was often a considerable risk that a cowboy would fall from a horse: he often had to ride young, unpredictable horses, and he had to do challenging ranch work in rugged terrain, which often meant that he could accidentally become unseated by a quick-moving horse. If a rider fell from a horse but had a boot get caught in the stirrup, there arose a significant risk that the horse could panic and run off, dragging the cowboy, thus causing severe injury and possible death.

The tall leather shaft of the boot helped hold the boot in place without lacing. The tall shaft, comfortably loose fit, and lack of lacing were all additional features that helped prevent a cowboy from being dragged since his body weight could pull his foot out of the boot if he fell off while the boot remained stuck in the stirrup. While mounted, the shaft also protected the lower leg and ankle from rubbing on the stirrup leathers, as well as fending off brush and thorns, particularly if also worn with chaps or chinks. While dismounted, the shaft helped protect the leg and foot from rocks, brush, thorns, and rattlesnakes. The high tops helped prevent the boot from filling with mud and water in wet weather or creek crossings.

The modern roper style boot with a low heel and shorter shaft emerged from the traditional design in response to the needs of modern rodeo, particularly calf roping, where the cowboy had to run to tie the calf as well as to ride. The lower shaft resulted in a less expensive boot but also allowed the boot to be more easily removed. A lace-up design for roper boots became popular, preventing the boot from falling off too easily and providing more ankle support when on foot. However, the lacer also has safety issues because it will not fall off if a rider is hung up in a stirrup, and lacking a smooth upper, the lacings may make it easier for the boot to become caught in the stirrup in the first place.

Decoration varied widely. Early boots were cowhide leather pieced together with single rows of topstitching. Still, as custom boots were made, cowboys asked for decorative stitching, cutouts in the high tops (early on, often Texas stars), and different materials. The interaction of wild west shows and, later, western movies influenced styles that working cowboys sometimes adopted. Modern cowboy boots are available in all colors. They can be made from almost every animal whose skin can be made into leather, including exotic materials such as alligator and ostrich.

Women's boots have become a significant part of the more recent history of cowboy boots.

Toe styles have varied through the years, but the basics remain the same. Popular toe styles include snip, wide snip, square, and round.

One accessory used with cowboy boots is spurs, which are sometimes attached to the heel of each boot to cue a horse while riding.

== See also ==
- List of boots
- List of shoe styles
- Cowboy hat
- Western wear
- Boot
- Acme Boots
- The Frye Company
- Double-H Boots
- Lucchese Boot Company
- Tony Lama Boots
- Old Gringo Boots
