= Acme Brick =

American Brick Manufacturer

Acme Brick Company
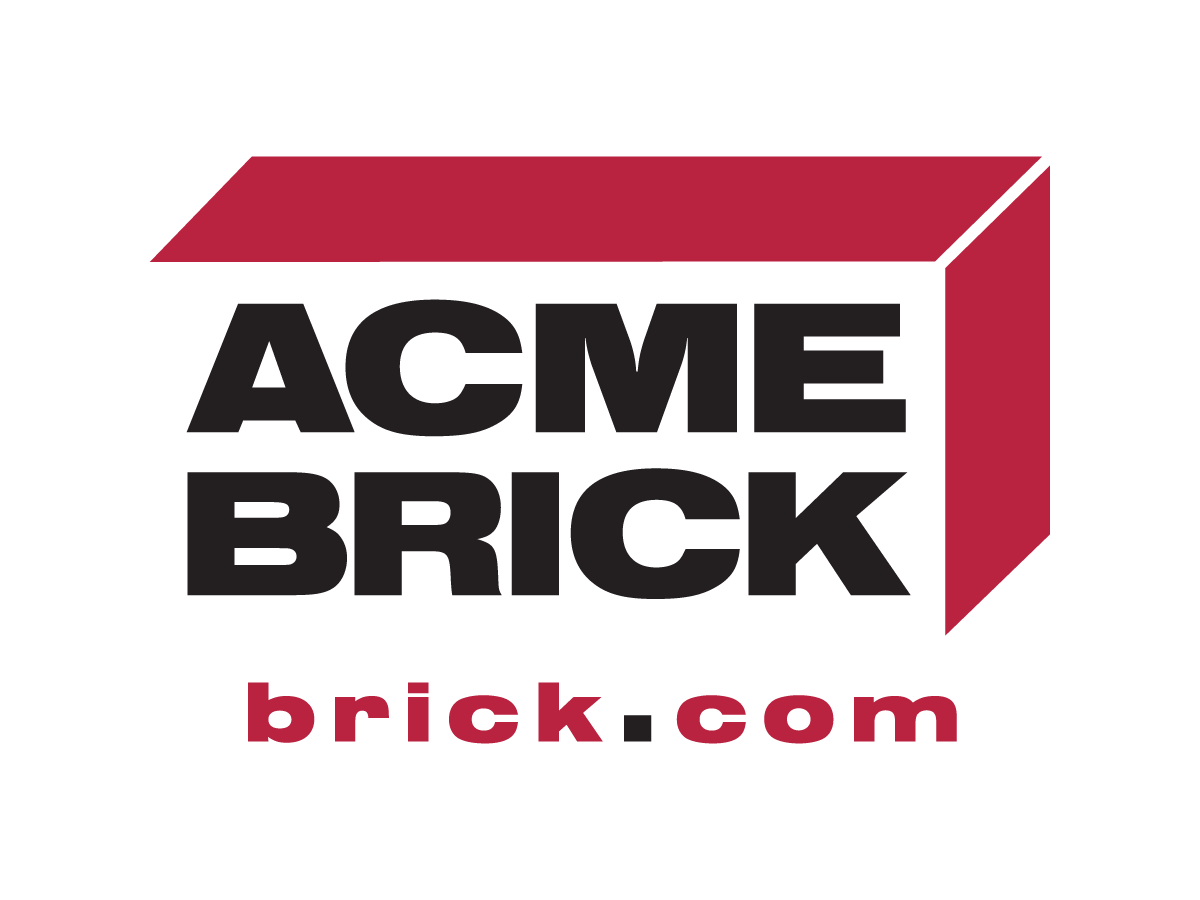
- Type: Subsidiary
- Industry: Manufacturing and Distribution
- Founded: 1891; 135 years ago in Bennett, Texas, United States
- Headquarters: Fort Worth, Texas, United States
- Key people: Ed Watson (president and CEO)
- Products: Brick, Tile, Concrete Block, Glass Block Systems, and Cut Natural Stone
- Number of employees: 1,915 (2023)
- Parent: Berkshire Hathaway
- Website: www.brick.com

Acme Brick Company is an American manufacturer and distributor of brick and masonry-related construction products and materials. Founder George E. Bennett (October 6, 1852 – July 3, 1907), chartered the company as the Acme Pressed Brick Company on April 17, 1891, in Alton, Illinois, although the company's physical location has always been in Texas. The company grew to become the largest American-owned brick manufacturer by the mid-20th century and was the first of its type to offer a 100-year limited guarantee to its customers. Acme Brick Company was acquired by Berkshire Hathaway on August 1, 2000.

== Etymology ==
Acme (ακμή; English transliteration: akmē) is Ancient Greek for "(highest) point, edge; peak of anything", being used in English with the meaning of "prime" or "the best", initially when referring to a period in someone's life and then extending to anything or anyone who reaches perfection in a certain regard.

== History ==
- In 1890, Acme Pressed Brick Company was established fifteen miles (24 km) southwest of Weatherford, Texas near present-day Farm Road 113, in southwestern Parker County, Texas. The company town that evolved from the establishment of the manufacturing plant was called 'Bennett'. The community included Acme Brick homes (for 100 employees and their families), a church, a public school, and a general store.
- In 1916, Acme Pressed Brick stockholders elected new officers, applied for a Texas charter, began doing business as Acme Brick Company, and dissolved the company chartered in Illinois. Walter R. Bennett (George E. Bennett's son) was elected the first president of the newly renamed Acme Brick Company.
- In 1968, a merger of the Acme Brick Company and the Justin Boot Company resulted in the formation of the First Worth Corporation.
- In 1972, First Worth Corp. changed its name to Justin Industries, Inc., a 'parent' corporation that would grow to acquire many 'children' companies.
- In 1976, Featherlite (then known as Kingstip-Featherlite) was acquired. Featherlite began as a Texas-based, privately held company in 1949. It started acquiring concrete block companies in 1953. It continued its expansion over the years, now operating seven block-producing facilities, two cement bagging facilities in Texas, and three other locations.
- In 1981, as housing starts hit a 35-year low, Acme built inventory: 400 million bricks were manufactured by the end of the year.
- In 1984, record housing starts propelled Acme to record sales years in 1983 and 1984.

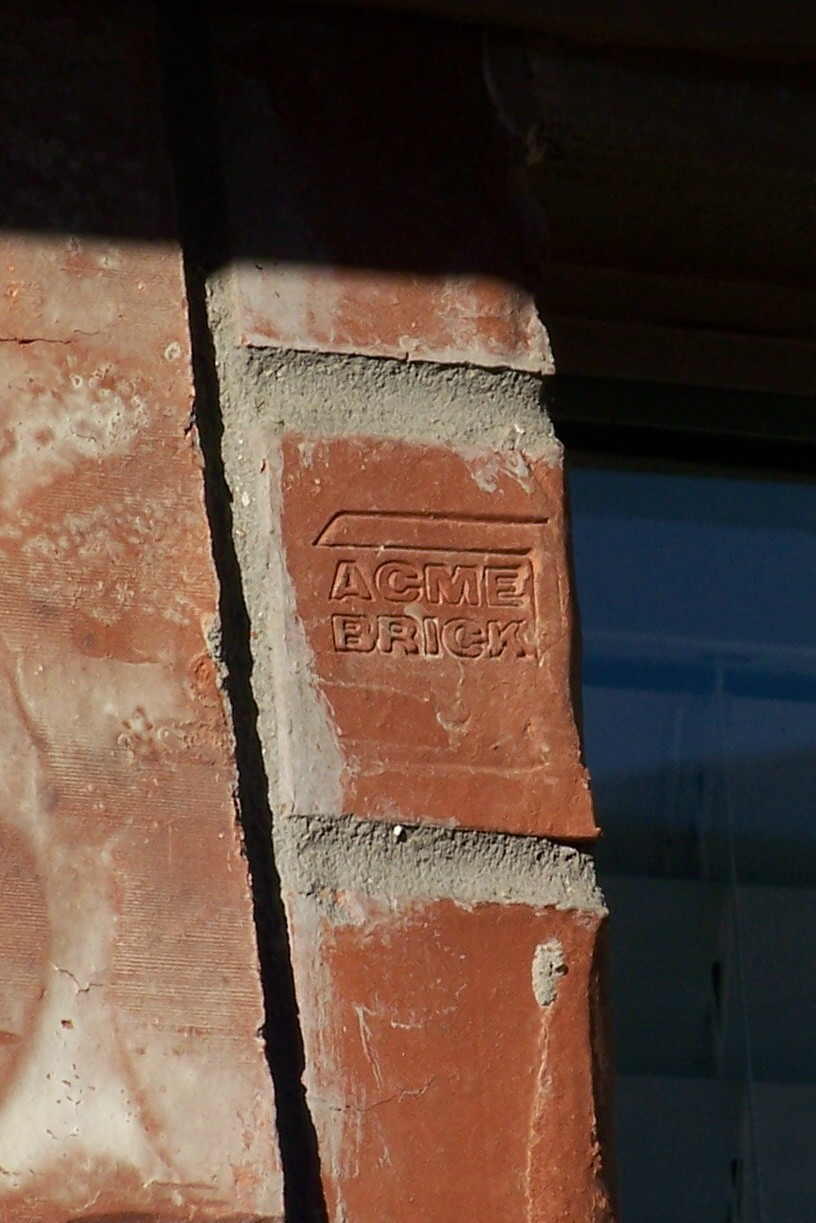
Acme Brick stamps its logo into the end of select bricks.

- In 1987, Acme began stamping its logo on one end of select residential brick. This tradition in brand recognition continues today.
- In 1993, Troy Aikman, a Hall of Fame quarterback for the Dallas Cowboys football team, became an Acme Brick spokesperson—initially in radio and print advertising and later on television.
- In 1994, American Tile Supply, a tile distributor and retailer in Texas, was acquired.
- In 1997, Fort Worth-based Innovative Building Products, developer and manufacturer of a mortarless installation system for glass block windows, skylights, shower enclosures, and floors, was acquired.
- In 2000, the Justin Industries Board of Directors approved the sale of the publicly traded company to Warren Buffett and Berkshire Hathaway. The boot and building companies were split to form Justin Brands and Acme Building Brands as separate entities. At the time of the acquisition, Acme Building Brands was 'parent' to the following four 'child' companies:
  - Acme Brick Company is the leading domestically owned United States manufacturer of face bricks.
  - Featherlite Building Products Corporation is the leading Southwest producer of concrete masonry products.
  - American Tile Supply Company is a major distributor of ceramic and marble floor and wall tile in Texas.
  - Justin Brands - Justin Boot Company, Nocona Boot Company, Tony Lama Company, and Chippewa Shoe Company.
- In 2001, Acme Brick set a new company record for shipments - exceeding 1 billion company-manufactured bricks shipped.
- In 2003, Acme Brick's residential products started carrying the Good Housekeeping Seal.

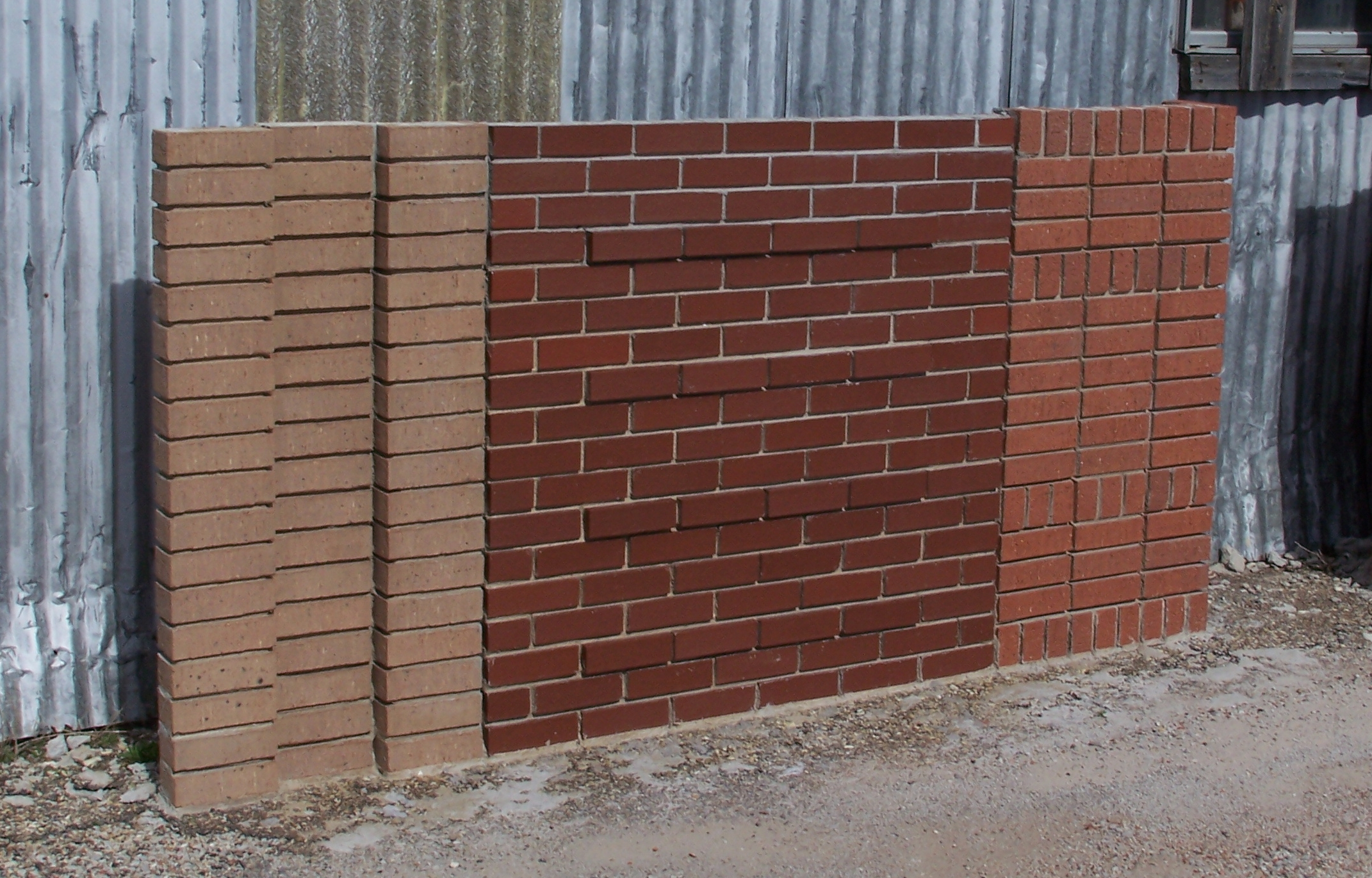
Brick mock-up panels are sometimes created to aid commercial customers in the selection process. These bricks are likely candidates for the new Acme Brick Company Headquarters building.

- On October 6, 2006 (October 6 was also the birthday of Acme's founder, George Bennett), Acme Brick broke ground for the company's new headquarters building to be located in southwest Fort Worth. The 77,000-square-foot (7,200 m^{2}), three-story building was completed in 2007.
- On January 24, 2011, Acme Brick agreed to purchase Jenkins Brick, which is headquartered in Alabama and has stores in four southeastern states.

== Manufacturing plants ==
Acme Brick manufactures brick (primarily for U.S. customers) at plants located in four states:

- Birmingham, Alabama
- Montgomery, Alabama
- Clarksville, Arkansas (known as Acme's Eureka Brick Plant) (permanently closed)
- Fort Smith, Arkansas (permanently closed)
- Jonesboro, Arkansas (formerly known as Acme's Wheeler Plant)
- Malvern, Arkansas (Acme has 3 plants in Perla; Perla Westgate, Perla Eastgate, and Acme's Ouachita Plant)
- Castle Rock, Colorado (known as Acme's Denver Brick Plant) (permanently closed)
- Kanopolis, Kansas (permanently closed)
- Holly Springs, Mississippi (permanently closed)
- Oklahoma City, Oklahoma
- Tulsa, Oklahoma (Acme also operates a brick engraving facility at this location)
- Bridgeport, Texas (permanently closed)
- Denton, Texas (Denton Plant, Denton Showroom, Acme Brick Technical Center all at the same location)
- Elgin, Texas (Acme has 2 plants in Elgin; Elgin Plant and Elgin New Plant)
- Garrison, Texas (permanently closed)
- Malakoff, Texas (Acme has 2 plants in Malakoff; Texas Clay A Plant, Texas Clay B Plant)
- McQueeney, Texas (permanently closed)
- Millsap, Texas (Acme's first plant - also known as the 'Bennett Plant')
- Sealy, Texas (known as the San Felipe Plant)
- Springfield, Minnesota (known as the 'Acme Ochs Plant' or "Great Lakes Plant") (permanently closed)

== Sales offices ==
Acme Brick sells manufactured and purchased products from sales offices located in ten states:

- Alabama (Albertville, Birmingham, Dothan, Florence, Gadsden, Huntsville, Mobile, Montgomery, Tuscaloosa)
- Arkansas (Fort Smith, Hot Springs, Jonesboro, North Little Rock, and Springdale)
- Florida (Pensacola, Tallahassee)
- Georgia (Columbus, Savannah)
- Kansas (Olathe and Wichita)
- Louisiana (Baton Rouge, Monroe, and Shreveport)
- Mississippi (Gulfport, Holly Springs)
- Missouri (Joplin, and Springfield)
- New Mexico (Las Cruces)
- Oklahoma (Oklahoma City, Tulsa)
- South Carolina (Ridgeland)
- Tennessee (Chattanooga, Knoxville, Jackson, and Memphis)
- Texas (Abilene, Amarillo, Austin (Round Rock), Bryan, Beaumont, Denton, El Paso, Euless, Houston, Lubbock, Longview, Midland, San Antonio, San Angelo, Temple, Texarkana, Tyler, and Waco)

== Acme Brick Technical Center ==
Acme Brick's Exploration Department, Quality Management, and Laboratory are based at the Acme Brick Technical Center in Denton, Texas. Acme Brick Technical Center Webpage

== Subsidiaries ==
- Jenkins Brick (permanently closed)
- Texas Quarries (quarry only)
- IBP (Innovative Building Products)
- Acme Brick Tile and Stone (formerly American Tile and Stone)
- Featherlite Building Corporation
