= Justin Boots =

American footwear company

- Company type: Subsidiary
- Founded: 1879; 147 years ago in Gainesville, Texas
- Founder: H.J. Justin
- Headquarters: Fort Worth, Texas, United States
- Parent: Justin Brands
- Website: justinboots.com

Justin Boots is an American western and equestrian footwear brand. It is a division of Justin Brands, Inc., itself a subsidiary of Berkshire Hathaway.

== History ==
Herman Joseph Justin, the son of a cigar maker, started repairing boots in Spanish Fort, Texas. After receiving a loan to purchase materials, he began making his own cowboy boots.

Justin was an early user of decorative stitching, incorporating rows of stitches across the boot tops as a means of stiffening the leather, preventing it from folding around the ankles.

In 1887, Justin married Louanna "Annie" Allen. In the early 1890s, Annie Justin developed a self-measuring kit, making it possible for customers to order the company's products by mail.

When a railroad was built in Nocona, Texas, in 1889, the Justins moved there to capitalize on the larger market opportunity. "Daddy Joe" and Annie had seven children — three sons and four daughters — who each helped with the family business. In 1908, Justin told his two oldest sons, John and Earl, that they would become equal partners in the family business. He then changed the name of his boot company to H.J. Justin & Sons.

The Justins moved the business to Fort Worth, Texas, in 1925, except for daughter Enid Justin, who believed her father would have wanted the business to remain in Nocona. She later founded Nocona Boots.

In 1947, annual sales reached $1 million. Three years later, Joe's grandson, John Justin Jr., bought out the company's stock and gained control of the company. On Nov. 3, 1950, John Jr. became vice president and general manager of H.J. Justin & Sons, Inc.

The company merged with Acme Brick Company in 1968 to become First Worth Corporation. In 1972, John Justin Jr. was elected president and chairman of the board, and the company's name officially changed to Justin Industries, Inc.

Nocona Boot Company became part of Justin Industries when John Justin purchased the controlling shares from his aunt, Enid Justin, in 1981. In 1984, the company acquired Chippewa Shoe Company. In 1990, Justin Industries purchased competitor Tony Lama Boots.

In 1999, John Justin stepped down from his role as chairman of the board of Justin Industries, Inc., and in 2000 the board of directors for Justin Industries approved the sale of the company to Warren Buffett and the Berkshire-Hathaway Corp.

== Sponsorships ==
Justin Boots has been a sponsor of the Professional Rodeo Cowboys Association (PRCA) and Women's Professional Rodeo Association (WPRA) for many years and supports professional rodeo athletes through the Justin Sportsmedicine Team and the Justin Cowboy Crisis Fund. The Justin Sportsmedicine Team made its debut at the National Finals Rodeo (NFR) in 1980 and provides emergency attention to injured competing athletes onsite. The Justin Cowboy Crisis Fund was established in 1989 to provide financial assistance to injured rodeo athletes and has since raised more than $1.1 million. Justin Boots was also a sponsor of the Professional Bull Riders (PBR) from 1994 through 2001 and the Justin Sportsmedicine Team also tended to injured PBR riders during that time period.

Justin Boots has been a longtime sponsor of Billy Bob's Texas, the world's largest honky tonk and its small, indoor dirt arena where live bull riding events are held on the weekends.

Justin Boots has also been a sponsor of several professional rodeo personalities (contestants, announcers, stock contractors, bullfighters and barrelmen) throughout the years.

Justin Boots is the official boot sponsor of the ProRodeo Hall of Fame.

Justin Boots is the official boot sponsor of the Miss Rodeo America pageant.

Justin Boots is the official cowboy boot sponsor of the American Quarter Horse Association (AQHA).

Justin Boots is the official cowboy boot sponsor of the Texas FFA.

Justin Boots is the official cowboy boot sponsor of Major League Baseball's Texas Rangers.
