= Old Gringo Boots =

American footwear company

- Company type: Independent
- Founded: 2000; 26 years ago in León, Guanajuato, Mexico
- Founder: Ernie Tarut; Yan Ferry
- Headquarters: Fort Worth, Texas, United States
- Products: footwear, clothing
- Website: oldgringoboots.com

Old Gringo Boots is an American western and equestrian footwear brand.

== History ==
Old Gringo Boots was founded in 2000 by Ernie Tarut and Yan Ferry in León, Mexico. The company initially had its U.S. headquarters in San Diego, however it announced plans to relocate to Fort Worth in 2022.

The brand also operates a flagship store in the Fort Worth Stockyards.
