= Tony Lama Boots =

American footwear brand

- Type: Subsidiary
- Industry: Shoes
- Founded: 1911; 115 years ago in El Paso, Texas, United States
- Founder: Tony Lama
- Headquarters: El Paso, Texas, United States
- Products: Shoes, Boots
- Revenue: US$65 million
- Parent: Justin Brands
- Website: www.tonylama.com

Tony Lama Boots is a western boot brand and a division of Justin Brands, a Berkshire Hathaway corporation.

== History ==
Tony Lama was born to Italian immigrant parents in 1887. He first learned the leather and boot trade as an 11-year-old shoemaker's apprentice in Syracuse, New York. In the early 20th century, Lama joined the U.S. Cavalry as a cobbler for the soldiers stationed at Fort Bliss, Texas. After completing his service in 1911, he stayed in the border town of El Paso, Texas. While there, Lama met and married Esther Hernandez, a pianist and music teacher. Soon after, he opened a small shoe and boot repair shop. Repairs were initially the biggest part of his business, but the boots he made soon became popular. In the first year, together with his one employee at the time, Lama sold 20 pairs of handcrafted boots.

By the 1930s, Western wear stores began asking for Tony Lama's boots. In response, he developed methods to produce greater quantities. Over the next two decades, Lama's six children became actively involved in the business. In 1946, his son, Joseph "Bert" Lama, presented a custom pair of gold and silver inlaid boots to U.S. President Harry S. Truman. In the 1950s, the company began marketing its boots nationally.

In 1961, nearly 50 years after the first store opened, the company moved into larger quarters and began making 750 pairs of boots a day. By the late 1960s, the company moved to a new factory on El Paso's east side. In 1990, Tony Lama Boots was sold to Justin Industries.
