= Sebo (disambiguation) =

Sebo is a German vacuum cleaner brand.

Sebo may also refer to:

- Sebo (name), a given name and surname
- Caleta de Sebo, a settlement in the Canary Islands

== See also ==
- Sibo (disambiguation)
