= Columbus Council =

Columbus Council may be:

- Columbus Council (Georgia)
- Columbus Council (Ohio)
