= Sibo =

Sibo or SIBO may refer to:

- Sibo, Sweden, a town in Sweden
- Sibö, a deity of the indigenous Bribri people
- Xibe people or Sibo, a Manchu ethnic group in Xinjiang, China
  - Xibe language, spoken by the Sibo people
- Sibo (poet), 思柏, Chinese Qing dynasty poet
- Small intestinal bacterial overgrowth (SIBO), a disorder of the small intestine
- SIBO, an operating system used by the Psion Organiser pocket computer

== See also ==
- Sibos (conference), an annual banking conference held in various cities around the world
- Sebo (disambiguation)
- Sibu (disambiguation)
