= Kirby Company =

Vacuum cleaner manufacturer and seller

Coordinates: 41.4788673°N 81.7676539°W

Kirby Opco, LLC
- Trade name: The Kirby Company
- Type: Division
- Industry: Consumer products
- Founded: 1914; 112 years ago; 1935; 91 years ago (as Kirby, a Scott & Fetzer Company)
- Headquarters: 1920 West 114th Street Edgewater, Ohio (1916–present) and 1345 NW 101 Street Andrews, Texas (1972–2026), United States
- Products: Housekeeping & Floorcare
- Parent: Right Lane Industries
- Website: kirby.com

Kirby Opco, LLC, doing business as The Kirby Company (stylized as KIRBY), is a manufacturer of vacuum cleaners, home cleaning products and accessories, located in Cleveland, Ohio, United States. It is a division of Right Lane Industries. Dealers, sales reps, service centers, and distributors are located in over 50 countries. Kirby vacuum cleaners are sold via door-to-door or through arranged-scheduled in-home demonstrations via their website and the company is a member of the Direct Selling Association. The Kirby website can also take vacuum cleaner orders and ship directly to the customer as well, without having to arrange for a scheduled in-home demonstration. All Kirby vacuum cleaners are built in both Edgewater, Cleveland, Ohio and Andrews, Texas, United States. The Andrews factory was shuttered in 2026 and all operations moved to Ohio.

== History ==
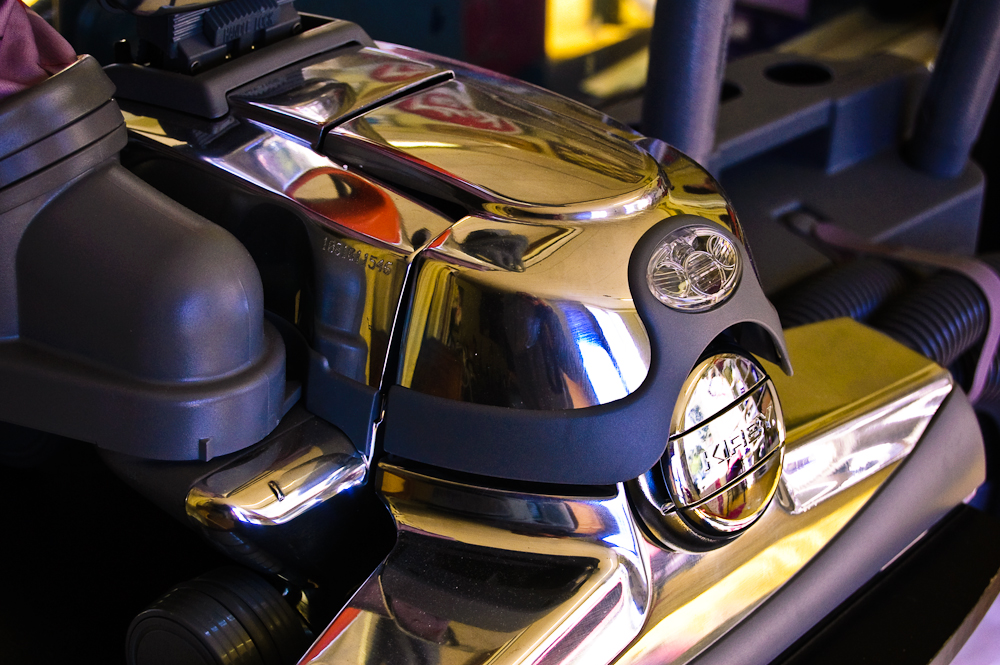
Kirby Sentria (2006–2012)

Jim Kirby (1884–1971) designed the first Kirby vacuums for George Scott and Carl Fetzer after World War I, although the Kirby name was not used on a vacuum cleaner until the 1930s. James Kirby invented the "vacuette" circa 1919. The company's primary competitors included The Hoover Company and The Eureka Company, both of which began operations in 1909, as well as Bissell that started building carpet sweepers in 1876. Their primary European competitor was Electrolux, which started 1924. Dyson, Miele and Sebo followed in the 1980s, and Shark began in the 1990s.

Introduced in 1916, the Edgewater, Ohio, factory was opened by the Scott & Fetzer Company at Locust Ave. (now Franklin Blvd.) and W. 114th St., and the Vacuette Electric was introduced. It featured a removable floor nozzle and handle and became the forerunner of current multi-attachment Kirby vacuum models. The Vacuette was briefly offered as a manual vacuum cleaner, utilizing a spring-loaded worm gear driven by pulling the vacuum cleaner backwards; when pushing the machine forward, the worm gear would power a turbine that provided suction (in the late 1980s the Vacuette name was resurrected and used on a corded handheld vacuum called Vacuette Handvac, which in design closely resembled Royal's iconic Dirt Devil corded handheld vacuum but featured a built-in headlight). As long as the cleaner was consistently pulled backwards, tension in the spring would remain constant and the turbine would continue spinning. It was designed for rural areas that did not have electricity and was very similar to the carpet sweeper. In 1935, the company introduced the Kirby Model C, the first product to carry Jim Kirby's name.

One of the key features is the amount of suction the motor generates. Beginning in the 1950s, owner's manuals listed an innovation the company called "Triple-Cushion Vibration" rug cleaning action. The current Avalir 2 has been given an airflow rating of 132 cubic feet per minute, which allows it to lift the carpet off the floor, flexing the surface to be cleaned, whereby the brush roll that spins at 3,200 RPM agitates and lifts the dirt, while grooming the carpet fibers from the base of the carpet. The owners manual recommend that the carpet nozzle be lowered close enough to the surface so as to maintain a secure suction and minimize breaking the suction while cleaning the carpet. Another feature of the Kirby system is the modular design of both vacuum and accessories, allowing machines to be configured for numerous uses, from normal floor cleaning, tile surface scrubbing, wet floor mopping, to furniture shampooing and as a compact, handheld vacuum with extension hose attachments for various cleaning chores. This versatility also provides for add-on sales or bundling of the complete system.

Starting in the late 1940s the carpet cleaning floor nozzle with the brush roller could be removed, and the 1948 owners manual for the Model 508 called it the "Triple-Cushion Vibrator", which was powered by a removable rubber belt that was in contact with a metal shaft extending from the vacuum turbine blades, powered by the electric motor, and reattached to a brush used to polish floors, or an extended plastic hose that could accommodate a furniture dusting attachment. The Model 508 was also the first to offer a simple device on the front of the carpet nozzle called the "Belt Lifter" which was a metal lifter that easily removed the rubber drive belt and allowed other attachments to be installed on the drive unit. To accommodate cleaning rugs of a delicate nature, the "Belt Lifter" could disengage the rubber drive belt, allowing just suction to clean the surface which is still offered on all machines.

These attachments are still offered and the floor buffer was updated in the mid-1960s with a dry foam carpet shampoo attachment Kirby called the "Rug Renovator" that was first introduced with the two speed motor on the Dual Sanitronic 50 and is also still available. The carpet shampoo cleaning solution is in a clear tank that attaches to the motor exhaust where the dirt collection bag is attached as a vacuum cleaner, and uses compressed air generated by the electric motor. A plastic tube then sends the shampoo to the carpet scrubber brush that agitates the surface to be cleaned.

Kirby has remained with its original design, materials and functionality with enhancements added to aid in its operation and durability, and uses the "dirty-air" vacuum design. The company changes the appearance of the cleaner with revised color schemes and introduces new models with a similar core design. The attachments and appearance items are interchangeable between generations and some machines consist of parts from multiple models. Machines built in the 1930s, 40s, 50s and 60s are in operation worldwide and can be repaired or rebuilt with factory original parts.

All models used a cloth bag that allowed airflow to pass through and clean the air exiting the machine. Earlier versions of the cloth bag used dense duvetyne, and later corduroy cotton and wool fabric bags where fine grit, dander and other foreign contaminants collected. The cotton bag briefly had an integrated cleaning pocket within, called the "Sani-Pocket" introduced in 1964 with the Sanitronic, where embedded dirt could be dislodged from the interior surface of the bag while keeping the dirt contained inside. The owners manual for the cloth bag equipped machines recommended that the cloth bag be emptied after cleaning had been finished, to avoid dirt, fungus and bacteria from setting in the fibers of the bag, and preparing the machine for the next time.

Starting with the Tradition model, an internal, disposable paper bag was introduced in addition to the cotton cloth bag. The disposable paper bag provided a protective barrier against the interior surface of the cloth bag and offered the convenience of storing the cleaner when finished, and not requiring that the bag be emptied every time. With the introduction of the Generation 3 model in 1990, a HEPA certified dirt containment filter bag, labeled as "Micron Magic" which minimizes dust being expelled into the air from the machine. Beginning with the Generation 3, all Kirby's are installed with a self-propelled transmission, called "Tech Drive Power Assist", which is engaged with a lever at the bottom next to the foot operated power switch.

In the 1930s and the 1940s, Kirby started to offer their products in retail environments, and introduced the "R" series. They are identical to their "C" series, with differences being the power switch installed on the handle. The first model was the R, followed by the 2R, 3R and 4R. In 1970, input from Kirby distributors, dealers, management and customers guided Kirby engineers in developing the second-generation models, introduced as the Kirby Classic. This gave the opportunity to expand its manufacturing facilities outside of Cleveland. This coincided with the rising popularity of wall-to-wall custom installed carpet. In 1972, after Kirby Company founder Jim Kirby's death the previous year (1971), Kirby West began operations in Andrews, Texas at 1345 NW 101 Street (also known as North Seminole Highway), which doubled the company's manufacturing capacity. The company maintained a presence in Canada, located at 1009 Burns Street East in Whitby, which is no longer staffed, and briefly in the 1920s as Vacuette's, Ltd in the Miller Building at 48 York Street in Toronto.

Since the mid to late 1980's, the Kirby Company has hosted a world convention every few years called "Kirby World", usually held in Nashville, Tennessee, bringing together from all over the world, dealers, sales representatives, and distributors. Over a three–day period, speeches & lectures given by Kirby company executives and other keynote speakers, musical numbers by a professional dance group, along with actors highlighting the company's success and other topics showcasing the importance of maintaining customer loyalty and satisfaction, the newest model Kirby vacuum is unveiled, along with new Kirby home cleaning products and accessories along with demonstrations of those items (in other convention rooms). Sales awards and bonuses were also given out to Dealers and distributors for their best overall sales from the previous year through the "Kirby opportunity" and "Road to success" programs. In the months to follow, VHS tape and DVD box sets of that years "Kirby World" convention were later sent out to Dealers and distributors to help aide in training of new sales representatives. These convention video box sets (VHS or DVD.) are hard to find as these were never made available to the general public; however, some have surfaced every now and then on auction sites such as eBay.

Berkshire Hathaway bought Kirby's parent Scott Fetzer in 1986 for $315 million. Two years prior, Ivan Boesky had offered to buy Scott Fetzer for $60 a share, or $420 million. Warren Buffett has singled out Scott Fetzer to Berkshire's shareholders as the "prototype" for the "kind of company — and acquisition — he was interested in." According to Berkshire managers, "absolutely no changes were made to the existing Scott Fetzer business or management, and the entire business (and its jet) was preserved."

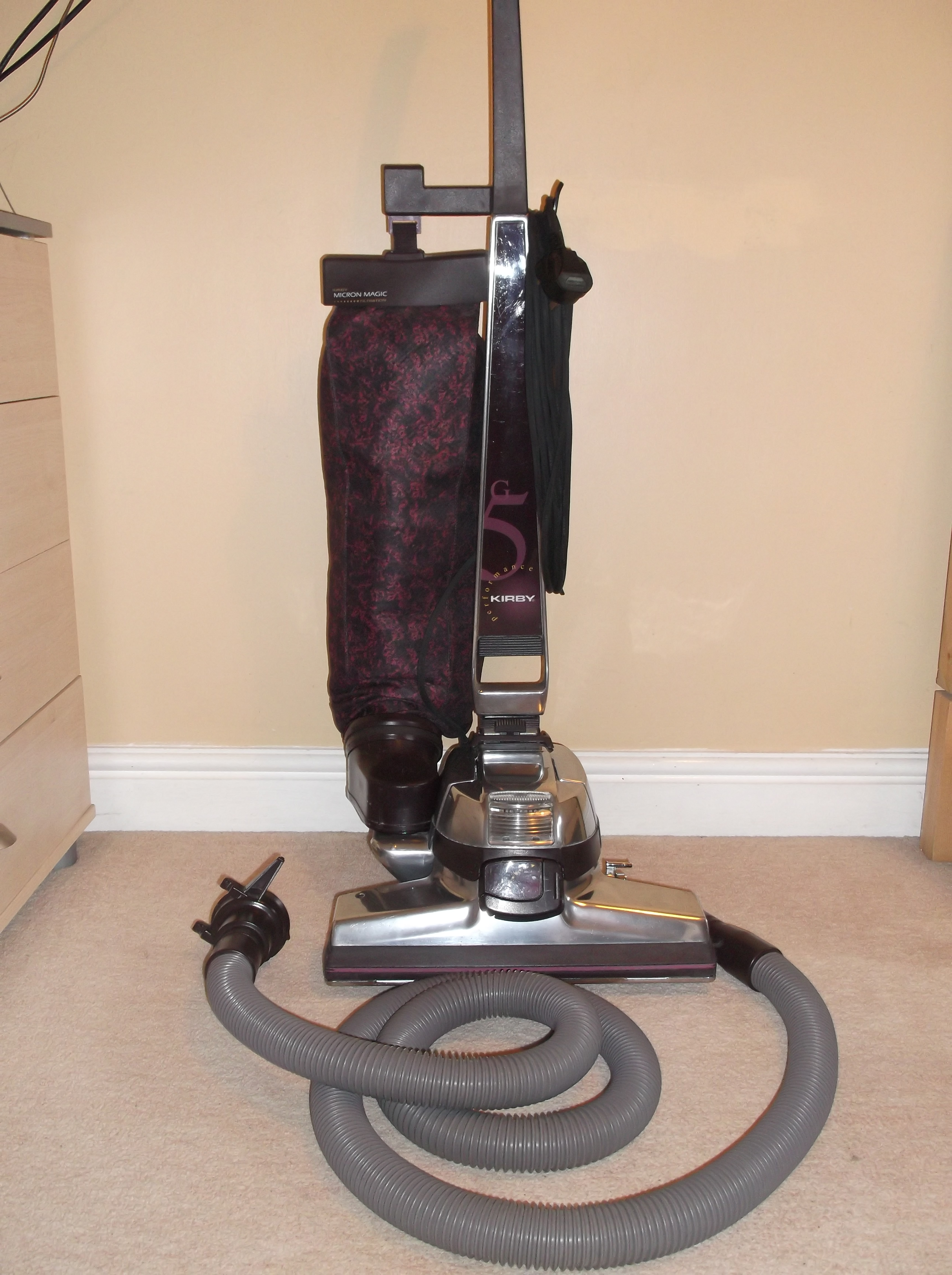
Kirby G5 (1997–1999)

As of 2003, Kirby was the largest source of revenue and profit for Scott Fetzer, with approximately 500,000 sales per year, about a third of which are outside the United States. In 2003, Scott Fetzer sold the vacuums to about 835 factory distributors, who in turn sell the vacuums door-to-door. As an incentive to new customers, Kirby offers the Service Center Vacuum Rebuild Program for original owners who have been registered with the company. As long as the customer owns the machine as the registered owner, if the cleaner needs repair, they can send it back to the Rebuild Department and have it restored to "like-new" condition. The company will completely disassemble it, repair or replace any worn Kirby parts, and sandblast, polish and buff metal parts back to a shiny "new" appearance. Internal components are also thoroughly inspected and repaired with Kirby replacement parts so that it will perform as originally designed.

In 2021, Berkshire Hathaway sold Kirby to the Chicago, Illinois based Right Lane Industries, ending its nearly century long history with Scott Fetzer.

In June 2026, Kirby suddenly shuttered the Andrews Texas manufacturing facility, ending more than 50 years operating in the region.

Not long after in August 2026, Kirby introduced a new line of 'Signature Series' plastic vacuum cleaners designed and engineered in America with manufacturing and assembly taking place in China.

== Legacy sales ==
A major facelift was done to the Kirby line with the Generation 3 series in 1990, with G3 and later models maintaining a traditional form, but with a modern look and tech-drive transmission. Internal improvements between models have continued (such as HEPA filtration, beginning with the Gsix in 1999), but outward changes throughout the entire Kirby production have been mostly in color scheme or minor detail.

Pricing of new, used and older Kirby vacuum models sold online or by secondhand thrift stores can vary widely based on overall condition and what number parts; attachments & accessories are included with it in the sale. A number of companies and secondhand dealers also offer refurbished Kirby vacuums.

== Criticism of marketing and sales practices ==
The practices of some of Kirby's independent distributors have been subject to criticism. The Kirby is included by Lon L. Fuller and Melvin A. Eisenberg, professors of Contract Law at Harvard Law School and UC Berkeley School of Law/Columbia Law School, as a textbook example of unconscionability. Kirby has been subject to relentless criticism by consumer protection agencies. As of 1999, of the 22 state consumer protection agencies, 15 had received a total of more than 600 complaints in just a few years. Between 1996 and 1999, the Wisconsin Department of Agriculture, Trade, and Consumer Protection received 50 complaints regarding Kirby dealers, and concluded from its investigation that Kirby, through its distributors, engaged in a "statewide pattern of trade practices" violation of state consumer-protection laws.

The Wall Street Journal records examples where an elderly couple was unable to remove three Kirby salesmen from their home for over five hours; in another example, a disabled woman who had been living alone in a mobile home on $1000/month in Social Security payments and suffering from Alzheimer's disease was discovered to own two Kirby vacuum cleaners, having paid $1,700 for the second one. In 2002, the Florida Agriculture and Consumer Services Commissioner obtained $13,000 in refunds for 13 senior citizens.

According to the Wall Street Journal, the device "costs more than four times what other top-of-the-line vacuum cleaners do." Kirby compares the price difference to that between luxury and economy cars, yet "luxury-car dealers don't make house calls in trailer parks. But Kirby dealers do." The Kirby vacuum cleaner is "marketed exclusively door-to-door — often to people who cannot afford a $1,500 gadget, but succumb to the sales pitch nonetheless."

In 2001, the West Virginia Attorney General obtained more than $26,000 in refunds and credits for dissatisfied Kirby buyers. In 2002, ABC's Primetime conducted a hidden-camera investigation in response to more than a thousand complaints regarding Kirby's salespeople. In June 2004, the Arizona Attorney General filed suit against Kirby distributors for violations of the Telemarketing and Consumer Fraud and Abuse Prevention Act, seeking an injunction against any other home sales. Public authorities flooded with complaints about Kirby vacuum cleaners is not a recent phenomenon; even in the 1960s and 1970s, Kirby had been "cited by various agencies a number of times" and the Detroit Better Business Bureau had received so many complaints that it decided to turn the matter over to the Wayne County prosecutor.

Kirby asserts it is not liable for the actions of its sales force, whom it describes as independent contractors. Its "Distributor Code of Ethics" enumerates 12 principles, including "observe the highest standards of character, honesty and integrity in dealings with my customers, fellow Distributors and other members of the Kirby profession." Kirby also asserts that it teaches its distributors direct-sales laws, and that it requires them to resolve complaints within 24 hours under threat of termination.

== Litigation ==
Between 1998 and 2001, in Alabama alone, more than 100 lawsuits were filed against Kirby and its affiliates and subsidiaries, resulting in nearly $2 million in judgments and settlements.

Twelve distributors of Kirby vacuums in Massachusetts were cited for violations of the Commonwealth's wage and hour laws by the Massachusetts Attorney General's Office in July 2010. The 12 distributors were cited for a variety of different wage and hour violations including nonpayment of wage, nonpayment of minimum wage, misclassification, child labor, retaliation and record-keeping violations. The distributors were fined a total of $199,300 for the violations and also ordered to pay restitution.

=== Sexual assault ===
The Supreme Court of Texas held Kirby liable for a rape committed by one of its door-to-door salesmen, finding that the manufacturer maintained control of its distributors and their salespeople, by requiring its distributors to make sales via in-home visits, and that the risk was foreseeable. In that case, the court found that, had the employee's references been checked, Kirby would have discovered complaints of inappropriate sexual behavior at his previous employer and an arrest and deferred adjudication for indecency with a child.

The North Dakota Supreme Court also held Kirby liable in a similar rape incident, where the salesman was hired after being convicted of assault and with charges of criminal sexual misconduct in the third degree pending against him.

=== Fraud and RICO ===
A federal class-action lawsuit is pending against Kirby under the civil action provisions of the Racketeer Influenced and Corrupt Organizations Act (RICO), for allegedly selling used vacuums as new; the complaint alleges that "Not only is Kirby aware of this practice, it 'participates in the scheme by, among other things, selling to its distributors duplicate or replacement "Original Purchaser's Registration" cards to be given to secondhand purchasers.'" The complaint also alleges that "Kirby commonly sells distributors new empty boxes and packaging material for the obvious purpose of repackaging units that the distributor previously sold to a prior customer." Kirby's motion to dismiss was rejected. After Kirby refused discovery requests for its sales contracts and other documents, Judge Clay D. Land compelled Kirby to disclose the requested documents.

A class-action lawsuit was also filed against Kirby in Bullock County Court in Alabama over its sales practices, specifically its use of credit cards issued expressly to fund Kirby purchases, under Truth in Lending laws. Kirby succeeded in persuading a trial judge to recuse himself.

=== Actions against unauthorized dealers ===
Kirby has sued unauthorized Kirby vacuum cleaner dealers for United States trademark infringement where the cleaners are identified by the Kirby name and logo. The United States Court of Appeals for the Fifth Circuit has held that such use does not constitute trademark infringement. The United States Court of Appeals for the Ninth Circuit vacated an injunction granted in Kirby's favor by a lower court in that Circuit based on similar trademark claims against an unauthorized distributor.

Kirby also did not prevail in a similar action against an unauthorized dealer in Minnesota, where it asserted trademark infringement, false and unfair competition, and trade disparagement; the authorized dealer prevailed on a $90,000 counterclaim against Kirby for defamation and then in a suit against an insurer who refused to defend the suit when the dealer refused Kirby's settlement offer. Kirby's parent lost another such suit in Minnesota based on trademark infringement and other related state law claims.

Nor did Kirby prevail in a tortious interference with contractual relations claim in Washington against an unauthorized retailer; the Washington Supreme Court awarded attorney's fees to the retailer. However, Kirby has prevailed in cases where unauthorized retailers went farther than using the name and logo to identify the vacuum cleaner, misrepresenting themselves as the manufacturer and claiming the existence of factory warranty.

== Bibliography ==
- Miles, Robert P. 2003. The Warren Buffett CEO: Secrets from the Berkshire Hathaway Managers.
