= Jim Kirby =

James Blaine Kirby (September 28, 1884 – June 7, 1971) was an American inventor and self-taught electrical engineer who focused his career on "eliminating the drudgery of housework". He is most notable for inventing the Kirby vacuum cleaner and the wringerless washing machine.

== Early life ==
James Kirby was born in Cleveland to James D. Kirby, a Great Lakes marine engineer and Sylvia Bigelow Kirby, who was descended from early Richfield pioneers. Kirby grew up in Cleveland's southwest side on Marvin Avenue with his younger brother Walter and an orphaned cousin, Bessie. Kirby got an early start on engineering when he attended Electricity and Magic classes at the YMCA. While attending Lincoln High School he worked as a lamplighter, where he walked up and down Scranton road and Denison avenue lighting and snuffing out the street lights, for which he earned $16.50 a month. He would often go to downtown Cleveland and "stuff" newspapers for a dollar a night.

== Inventions ==
He invented his first vacuum cleaner, called the Domestic Cyclone, in 1906, which was a hand-powered canister cleaner that used a water filtration system. His first portable vacuum cleaner for home use was manufactured and distributed by Franz Premier Electric, which was founded to produce Kirby's vacuum in 1914. Premier was later acquired by General Electric which continued to utilize Kirby's innovations. In 1915 Kirby invented the washing machine spin cycle. The LaunDRYette Company was founded to manufacture this invention. The LaunDRYette washing machines became very popular and Kirby's share of the profits allowed him to buy and expand his farm in Richfield. On the Richfield farm, Kirby could implement his experiments in civil engineering such as the patented lake and the mill wheel which was supported on ball bearings and could produce electricity much more efficiently than a traditional, heavy gristmill wheel.

During the first world War, Kirby served as a nominal volunteer, a “dollar-a-day man”; using his engineering background to help factories convert to war production. He was assigned to Scott and Fetzer machine shop on Cleveland's west side. He was impressed with their work, and after the war showed them the prototype of a new vacuum cleaner design. Scott and Fetzer began producing both electric and non-electric versions of Kirby's design under a new division named “Vacuette”.

Kirby continued his association with the Franz brothers, eventually becoming a trustee of their new company “Apex Electrical Manufacturing Company” which produced a variety of household appliances.

In 1935, Scott and Fetzer introduced a new division of their company which was named “Kirby”.

In 1940, Kirby was presented the Modern Pioneer Scroll of Achievement by the National Association of Manufacturers for “distinguished achievement in the field of science and invention which has advanced the American standard of living.”

In 1956, Kirby opened Oceanside Shopping Plaza in Pompano Beach Florida.

In 1935, the famous news reporter and radio personality Lowell Thomas wrote a book entitled "The Man Who Revolutionized the American Household" about Jim Kirby and his drive to harness electricity to ease household chores. Much of Lowell's work was devoted to describing Kirby's whimsical, innovative home at 4374 Broadview Road in Richfield, Ohio. Kirby had purchased the land in 1919 at the age of 35 after making his fortune with the invention of the washing machine spin cycle. He devised and patented a system of filtration dams that would keep silt out of the new lake he created. He situated his house on a hillside overlooking the lake and powered it with an experimental hydroelectric mill. In 1923, he constructed a new type of dance hall at the head of the lake that not only had a “sprung floor” but actually had industrial–strength springs supporting the floor joists.

== Personal life ==
Kirby married Nellie Heller, a former school teacher from Ghent, Ohio.

When they moved to a second Richfield location in 1936, they sold their former home to the Cleveland Girl Scout Council, which converted it into a camp later known as Crowell Hilaka. Generations of campers thereafter became familiar with the former Kirby estate. Kirby's Mill was preserved first as an arts and craft studio and later as a Girl Scout museum. It was placed on the National Register of Historic Places in 1979. The camp was sold to Richfield in 2015 and is now a public park: Richfield Heritage Preserve.
