= Benedict Crowell =

United States Army general (1869–1952)

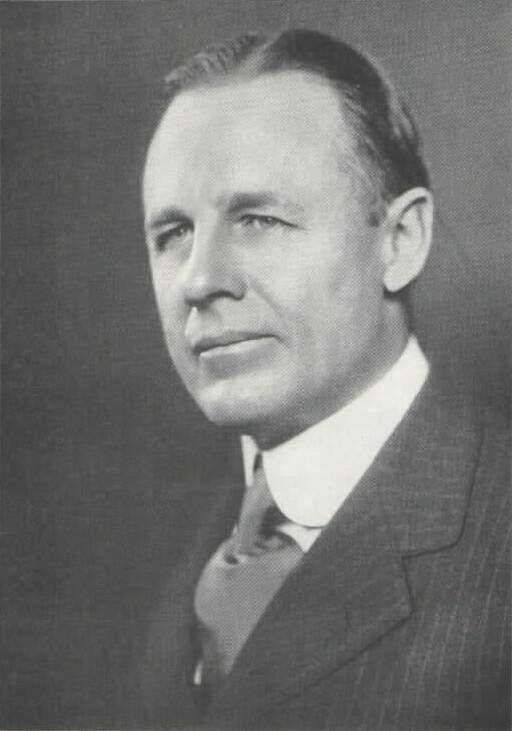

United States Assistant Secretary of War
- In office November 1917 – 1920
- President: Woodrow Wilson
- Preceded by: William Moulton Ingraham
- Succeeded by: William Reid Williams

President of the NRA
- In office 1930–1931
- Preceded by: Patrick J. Hurley
- Succeeded by: G. A. Fraser

Personal details
- Born: October 21, 1869 Cleveland, Ohio, U.S.
- Died: September 8, 1952 (aged 82) Cleveland, Ohio, U.S.
- Resting place: Arlington National Cemetery
- Spouse: Julia Cobb (m. 1904)
- Children: 2
- Education: Case School of Applied Science; Yale University (PhB, MA)

Military service
- Allegiance: United States
- Branch/service: Army Reserve
- Rank: Brigadier general

Benedict Crowell (October 21, 1869 – September 8, 1952) was a United States military officer and politician particularly influential in military organization during and following World War I. He was United States Assistant Secretary of War from 1917 to 1920.

== Early life ==
Benedict Crowell was born on October 21, 1869, in Cleveland, Ohio, to Mary (née Benedict) and William Crowell.

He attended public schools and the Case School of Applied Science. He attended Yale University, where he was admitted to the Zeta Psi fraternity, graduating in 1891 with both a Bachelor of Philosophy and a M.A. in 1918.

== Career ==
Crowell returned to Cleveland and became a chemist in the laboratories of Otis Steel Company. He was promoted to superintendent. He then organized the firm Crowell & Murray, metallurgists and chemists. He worked there as a mining engineer and chemist. He then formed Crowell & Little with Bascomb Little, a firm associated with testing reinforced concrete. The company disbanded after both men entered military service.

As the First World War loomed, he rose quickly through the ranks of the United States Army Reserve, being made first an honorary major on his entry in 1916, and eventually a brigadier general before being tapped for political positions. In 1916, he was appointed by Secretary of War Newton D. Baker to the Kernan Board, which investigated the manufacturing of munitions. At the outbreak of the war, Crowell was commissioned a major in ordnance and worked with the General Munitions Board to increase the flow of steel for the manufacturing of armaments. In 1917, he transferred to the U.S. Army Corps of Engineers and was put in charge of the Washington, D.C., office of the Panama Canal.

Crowell was named Assistant Secretary of War by Secretary Baker in November 1917. In 1918, he was given the additional title of Director of Munitions. During the war, he led the munitions program and the construction program of the War Department. He founded the Army Ordnance Association in 1919. After the armistice, he was in charge of industrial demobilization, the sale of surplus war materials, and the settlement of outstanding munitions contracts. He resigned on July 1, 1920. In 1920, he returned to Cleveland. He again teamed up with Bascomb Little and others in the firm Crowell-Lundoff-Little Company and the Crowell-Sherman-Statler Company. Crowell-Little had a contract in 1920 to build an addition to the Plain Dealer Building.

Crowell remained influential and active in politics, serving as a principal framer of the National Defense Act of 1920, and was president of the Army Ordnance Association, a lobbying group, for a quarter of a century until 1946. In December 1922 he was indicted with six others for conspiracy to defraud the U.S. government on contracts for construction of cantonments. The indictment was dismissed on January 30, 1925.

Crowell served as president of the National Rifle Association of America from 1930 to 1931. On January 24, 1931, he was nominated as brigadier general of the United States Army Reserve by President Hoover. He was regional director of the National Recovery Administration, Ohio director of the National Emergency Council, and regional director of the Federal Housing Administration and Social Security Board. He was also chairman of the Ohio Repeal Council, which fought against prohibition in Ohio. In 1938, he resigned as the regional director of the Social Security Board for Michigan, Ohio, and Kentucky. He then became president of Central National Bank. In 1941, he was director of the New York, Chicago & St. Louis Railroad.

In 1940, Crowell conducted a preliminary survey of the War Department's defense program for Secretary of War Henry L. Stimson. The effort was extended and he remained in Washington, D.C., as a special defense consultant under Secretary Stimson throughout his tenure through World War II. On June 4, 1946, he received the Williams Medal for his contributions to national defense.

Crowell wrote or assisted in the compiling of a number of books, including:

- How America Went to War (1921), co-written with Robert Forrest Wilson
- Munitions of War
- Iron Ores of Lake Superior, co-written with Charles B. Murray

== Personal life ==
=== Air crash ===
On October 8, 1919, Crowell was involved in an aviation accident at Roosevelt Field, Long Island, New York.

“MINEOLA, L. I., Oct. 8. – Benedict Crowell, assistant secretary of war, narrowly escaped injury this afternoon when an airplane in which he was riding, fell 50 feet to the ground here and overturned. Both Crowell and his pilot, Maurice Cleary, were buried under the machine, but escaped with a shaking up. The accident occurred when Cleary tried to avoid striking a hangar. Crowell announced his intention at once of going up in another machine.”

=== Family life and death ===
Crowell married Julia Cobb, daughter of one of the founders of drug firm Strong, Cobb & Company, of Cleveland in December 1904. They had two children, Florence and Benedict Jr. The family lived on Overlook Road and later moved to Wade Park Manor in Cleveland. He was a member of the American Institute of Mining and Metallurgical Engineers, the Society of American Military Engineers, the university and Yale Clubs of New York, the Army and Navy Club of Washington, and the Mid-Day Union, Tavern and Country Clubs of Cleveland.

Crowell died at a nursing home in Cleveland on September 8, 1952. He is buried with his wife in Arlington National Cemetery.

National Rifle Association of America
Preceded by Patrick J. Hurley	President of the NRA; 1930–1931	Succeeded by G. A. Fraser
