= Camp Julia Crowell =

American girl scout camp

Coordinates: 41.250°N 81.663°W

Camp Julia Crowell was a Girl Scout camp in Richfield Township, Summit County, Ohio, opened in 1937. It was named for Julia Cobb Crowell, a Cleveland civic leader who served as the city's first Girl Scout commissioner in the 1920s. The camp closed as a Girl Scout property in 2011.

Since 2014, the camp has been known as the Richfield Heritage Preserve, a public park administered by the Richfield Joint Recreation District. Camp Crowell Hilaka Historic District was added to the National Register of Historic Places in 2020.

== History ==
Camp Julia Crowell was opened by the Cleveland Girl Scout Council in 1937, to offer day- and overnight-camping programs, hiking, and water recreation for scouts, as well as national and regional training programs for scout leaders. The Girl Scouts also differentiated the camping experiences. One purpose of short camping excursions, such as weekend troop camping, was to have girls work on planning and skill training before the trip. At two-week resident summer camp, the purpose was to have girls learn skills while at camp, not beforehand. During summer resident camp, girls camped in tents only. During spring and fall, troops could stay in cabins or tents. In winter, camping stays were limited to winterized cabins or other buildings. It was built from 243 acres of land, lakes, and buildings, purchased from private land, and named for Julia Cobb Crowell (1877–1957), a Cleveland civic leader and Girl Scout commissioner in the 1920s. The land for Camp Crowell came was accumulated by James B. Kirby and sold to the Cleveland Girl Scout Council in 1937. It was a significant Girl Scout camp for its association with the Cleveland Girl Scout Council which was an early leader in racial integration and religious inclusion, regardless of the socioeconomic background of its scouts.

The camp expanded to 336 acres in by 1957, with the addition of the Hilaka (High-Lake) section. In 1967, the physical facilities underwent a major upgrade, with new commons buildings, water and sanitation systems. A new boathouse followed in 1969. In 1998, Camp Quality Northeast Ohio was held at Camp Crowell-Hilaka, serving children with cancer and their siblings.

== Camper incidents ==
On August 4, 1959, two thirteen-year-old campers were killed by lightning, and two other girls were hospitalized, during a storm at Camp Julia Crowell. In 1999, the parents of a child injured while riding a horse at the camp sued; all the camp's horses were sold in 2005.

== Closure and current status ==
The camp was sold by the Girl Scouts of North East Ohio in 2011, along with several other properties, despite an organized effort by Friends of Crowell Hilaka, to maintain the program and the site. The Richfield Joint Recreation District (RJRD) was formed by the Village of Richfield and Richfield Township for the purpose of purchasing Crowell Hilaka Girl Scout Camp, which was permanently closed in 2011. In November 2014, voters in the village and township passed two levies totaling $7.1 million to purchase and operate the property. The Western Reserve Land Conservancy entered into an agreement with the Richfield Joint Recreation District to purchased the property in 2015. At the August 22, 2016 Board meeting, the Richfield Joint Recreation District Board of Trustees voted to name the park Richfield Heritage Preserve.

In 2020, the Crowell Hilaka Historic District was added to the National Register of Historic Places.

Current park facilities include a segment of the Buckeye Trail, an event center, and accessible camping sites.

== Buildings ==
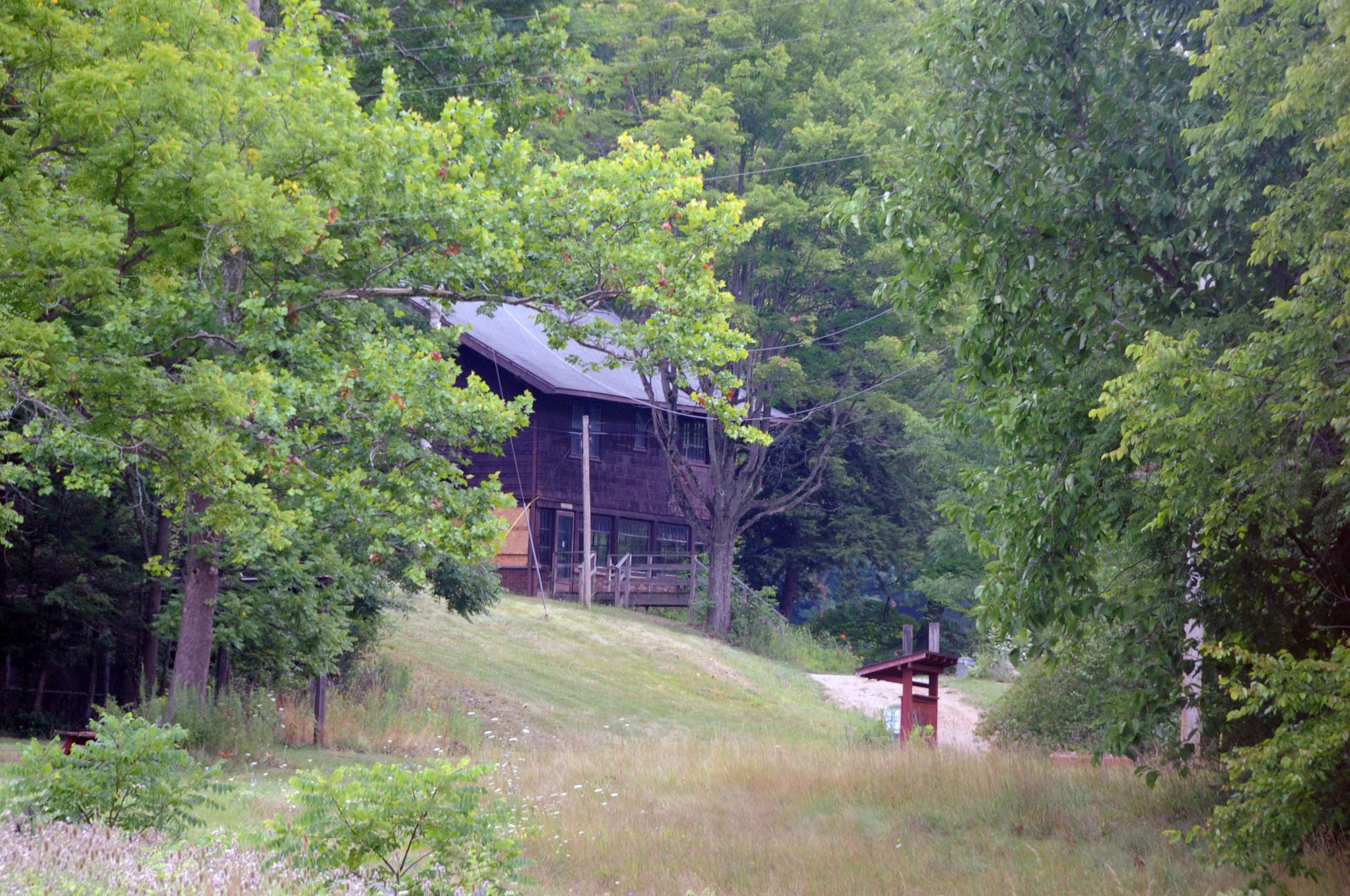
James Kirby Building, Richfield Heritage Preserve

Kirby's Mill: James Kirby's family home along with its water-powered mill wheel that produced hydroelectric power for his home and workshop. The mill was placed on the National Register of Historic Landmarks in 1978.

Garfield House: James Kirby's dance hall, built on heavy-duty streetcar springs which moved the floor when people were dancing.

Oviatt House: Built in 1836 and owned by Mason Oviatt and his wife Fanny Oviatt, the house is one of the oldest homes in Richfield and has ties to the Underground Railroad and the American abolitionist John Brown

== Park Affiliates ==
Baldwin Wallace University: The university conducts research on the ecosystem from the Richfield Heritage Preserve for educational purposes.

Buckeye Trail Association: The trail runs throughout Ohio and goes straight through the Richfield Heritage Preserve. Parts of the trails in the park are maintained by volunteers through this association.

Cuyahoga Valley Career Center (CVCC): assisted in renovations of the "Gatekeeper's House" located at the entrance of the park. Individuals from the career center helped design and implement renovations to the building.

Friends of Richfield Heritage Preserve (FoRHP): A non-profit organization created to help maintain and renovate the Richfield Heritage Preserve. Organization hosts fundraisers and sponsored numerous programs including lectures, organized hikes and community events.

Ohio Horseman’s Council: OHC and its volunteers held fundraisers to raise money used to clear and establish five miles of multi-use natural equine trails throughout the park. OHC also funded a gravel parking lot for the Summer Barn which now provides parking for horse trailers.

Ohio Operating Engineers: provides the operators and heavy machinery needed for earth moving, slope work, grading and trenching within the Preserve.

Oviatt House Incorporated: entered into an agreement with Richfield Joint Recreation District (RJRD) to restore and preserve the historic Oviatt House located in Richfield Heritage Preserve.

Richfield Historical Society: helped designate the lower lake property as a historic district on the National Registry of Historic Places. The lower lake is a central historical element within Richfield Heritage Preserve as it is the world’s only known patented lake. This designation makes the property eligible for historic preservation tax credits and other historic preservation grants.

Western Reserve Land Conservancy: helps the Richfield Joint Recreation District find additional public funding sources and potential uses for the property.
