= Julia Cobb Crowell =

American civic leader

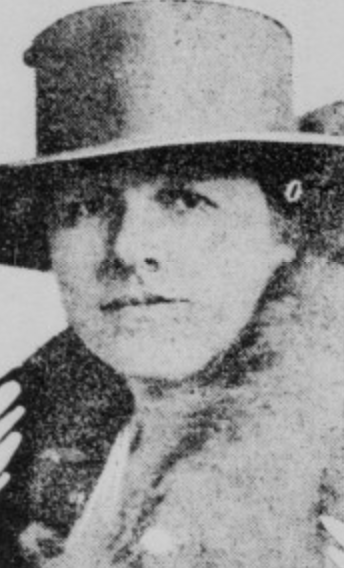
- Julia Cobb Crowell, from a 1918 publication
- Born: Julia Root Cobb; June 27, 1877; Cleveland, Ohio, U.S.
- Died: January 16, 1957 (aged 79); Cleveland, Ohio, U.S.
- Occupation: Civic leader
- Spouse: Benedict Crowell

Julia Cobb Crowell (June 27, 1877 – January 16, 1957), known socially as Mrs. Benedict Crowell, was a clubwoman in Cleveland, Ohio, and an early leader of Girl Scouting in the United States. She was married to military officer and politician Benedict Crowell.

== Early life ==
Julia Root Cobb was from Cleveland, the daughter of Lester Ahira Cobb and Anna W. Root Cobb. Her father was a businessman and banker; her grandfather was Ahira Cobb, a prominent Ohio shipbuilder. She was educated at Miss Mittleberger's School for Girls in Ohio, and at Miss Hersey's School in Boston.

== Career ==
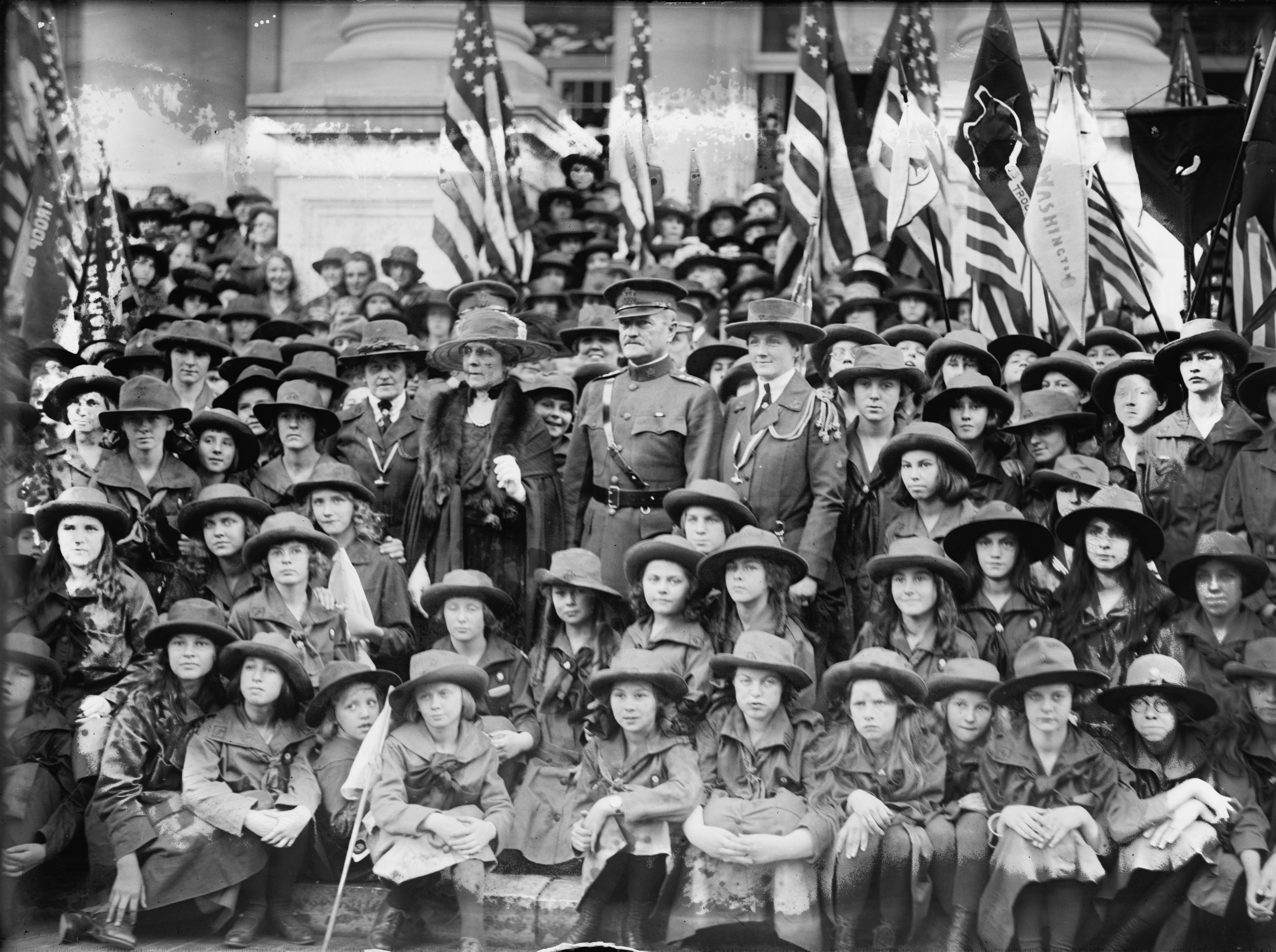
Mrs. Harding, General Pershing, Mrs. Benedict Crowell, at a 1921 gathering of Girl Scouts in Washington, D.C., from the Library of Congress

Crowell was active in Girl Scouting during and after World War I. While living in Washington, D.C. in 1920, she was the Commissioner of Girl Scouts in the District of Columbia, and an arts patron.

After the war, the Crowells moved back to Cleveland, where Julia Crowell founded the city's Girl Scout Council and was its first commissioner. In 1923 she and other Scouting leaders were sued for slander by a troop leader. She served on the national board of Girl Scouts in 1927 and 1928. Camp Julia Crowell was a 248-acre Girl Scout camp in Ohio, opened in 1937.

Crowell served on the founding board of trustees of the Maternal Health Association of Cleveland, and supported the city's children's hospital.

== Personal life and legacy ==
Julia Cobb married chemical engineer and banker Benedict Crowell in 1904. They had two children, Florence (1908–1982) and Benedict (1912–1966). She was widowed when her husband died in 1952; she died in 1957, aged 79 years. Her grave is with her husband's at Arlington National Cemetery. The Benedict Crowell Papers at the Western Reserve Historical Society include some of her papers.
