= Cebu (disambiguation) =

Cebu is an island province of the Philippines located in the Central Visayas (Region VII) region.

Cebu may also refer to:

== Places ==
- Cebu City, an independent highly urbanized city and the capital & largest city of the island province of Cebu
- Metro Cebu or Cebu Metropolitan Area, the metropolitan area centered on Cebu City
- Cebu Metropolitan Cathedral, a Roman Catholic church in Cebu City
- Cebu Strait, a strait in Central Visayas

== Ships ==
- BRP Cebu, a corvette of the Philippine Navy
- USS Cebu (ARG-6), a 1943 Luzon-class engine repair ship of the United States Navy

== Other uses ==
- Cebu, variant spelling of the cattle known as zebu
- Cebu (novel), by Peter Bacho
- Cebu Broadcasting Company, an affiliate of MBC Media Group
- Cebu F.C., football (soccer) club based in Cebu City
- Cebu Pacific, a Philippine low-cost airline

== See also ==
- Cebuano (disambiguation)
- Sibu (disambiguation)
