= Cebuano =

Cebuano may refer to:

- Cebuano people, of Cebu, Philippines
- Cebuano language, their Austronesian language
- Cebuano literature
- Cebuano theater

== See also ==
- Cebu (disambiguation)
- Cebuano Wikipedia
