= Miss Mittleberger's School for Girls =

Private school in Cleveland, Ohio

Information
- School type: Private Boarding School
- Established: 1877
- Founder: Augusta Mittleberger
- Closed: 1908
- Gender: Girls

Miss Mittleberger's School for Girls was a private boarding school in Cleveland, Ohio. The school was run by the educator and school proprietor Augusta Mittleberger.

== Augusta Mittelberger ==
Mittleberger was the daughter of Augusta N. and William Mittleberger, and niece of James M. Hoyt. Her father was a Canadian immigrant and merchant. She attended the Cleveland Academy run by Linda Thayer Guilford and later, the Cleveland Female Seminary (CFS). In 1863, she graduated from CFS, and according to the school's catalogue, she taught there in 1869.

Mittleberger was a member of the College Club of Cleveland. After her death, the club established the "Mittleberger Fund", a scholarship given to women with financial need.

== Miss Mittleberger's School for Girls ==
Mittleberger began tutoring young women privately in her home. After her father's death, she then opened a school, Mittleberger's School for Girls in 1877. The school included boarding and offered college preparatory coursework for its students. After its opening, the school quickly expanded and served many daughters of prominent citizens. The daughters of James A Garfield and Rutherford B. Hayes attended her school.

The school closed after Mittleberger's retirement in 1908. The building and surrounding land were owned by John D. Rockefeller, and after the school's closing, it was planned to be turned into an apartment building.

== Alumni ==
- Belle Sherwin
- Elizabeth R. Cutter (Mrs. Dwight W. Morrow)
- Rachel McMasters Miller Hunt
- Marie Remington Wing
- Julia Cobb Crowell, national Girl Scout leader from Cleveland
- Mollie Garfield, daughter of James A. Garfield and Lucretia Garfield
- Fanny Hayes, daughter of Rutherford B. Hayes
