= Sibu (disambiguation) =

Sibu may refer to:

== Places ==
- Sibu, Sarawak in East Malaysia
- Sibu District
- Sibu Division
- Sibu (federal constituency), represented in the Dewan Rakyat
- Sibu (crater), an impact crater on Mars
- Pulau Sibu, an island off Johor state, the eastern coast of peninsular Malaysia

== People ==
- Sibu Misra (born 1969), Bharatiya Janata Party politician from Assam
- Sibu Soren (born 1944), Indian politician, Chief Minister of Jharkhand

== Religion ==
- Sibú, a Costa Rican deity

== See also ==
- Mana Sibu, one of the 180 woredas in the Oromia Region of Ethiopia
- Sibu Sire, one of woredas in the Oromia Region of Ethiopia
- Sibiu, a city in Romania, capital of Sibiu County
- Sibo (disambiguation)
- Cebu (disambiguation)
