= Sibo (poet) =

- 思柏
- Occupation: Poet
- Spouse(s): Yong-shu

Sibo (Chinese: 思柏; born c. 1702) was a Chinese Qing Dynasty poet and essayist known only by her art name.

Sibo was the daughter of A-han-tai, a vice commander-in-chief of the Plain Yellow Banner. She was wife of Yong-shou, a vice minister. When Yong-shou died at the age of thirty, the widow Sibo was left to raise her children, and later raised the children of Yong-shou's deceased brother Yong-fu as well. To help raise and educate the large family, she hired Gong Danting, the 60-year-old widow of a district magistrate.

A few years after Gong Danting returned to Yangzhou, Sibo published Preserved Together: Selected Poems (Hecun shichao, 1738), a collection of poems she and Gong Danting exchanged over the decade they lived in the same household. In 1741, she published a collection of seven essays, Beyond Poetry: Combined Explanations (Shiyu hejie), with five essays by Sibo, one by Gong Danting, and one by her student Yuxuan. Sibo wrote on topics including the education of daughters and sons and the writing of mourning poems.
