= Sebo =

Brand name of vacuum cleaners

Coordinates: 51.3091033°N 7.0663713°E

SEBO
- Industry: Consumer products
- Founded: 1978; 48 years ago
- Founder: Klaus Stein and Heinz Kaulig
- Headquarters: Wulfrather Strasse 47-49, Velbert, Germany
- Products: Housekeeping
- Parent: Stein & Co GmbH

SEBO is the brand name of vacuum cleaners made by Stein & Co GmbH, a company based in the German town of Velbert. They produce a range of upright and cylinder vacuum cleaners for domestic and commercial use. SEBO stands for SEmigewerbliche BOdenpflege, German for semi-commercial floor care.

== History and commercial heritage ==
SEBO was established in 1978 by two German engineers, Klaus Stein and Heinz Kaulig, who were seeking to build a reliable, powerful and easy to use commercial upright vacuum cleaner. Klaus Stein had formerly worked at Vorwerk, the manufacturer of the Kobold vacuum cleaner since 1929. The first SEBO factory was located in Velbert, West Germany in a disused weaving factory where they developed in 1978 the SEBO 350 upright commercial vacuum cleaner.

The 350 was their first upright vacuum cleaner, and it was engineered for commercial use, designed to pass the hardest test: to survive the abuse and neglect of cleaning professionals.

Due to the patented technical features that allowed effective cleaning of all kinds of carpets and bare floors, plus the ability to clean in the tightest corners, the 350, which indicated that the brush vibrator bar was 35 cm (14 in), was sold and used in hotels, hospitals and offices. With the addition of features like a clutch-protected brush roller, a by-pass motor and hospital-grade filtration, the first SEBO found acceptance in the market by 1979. Commercial cleaning manufacturers such as Windsor Kärcher and Jeyes Hygiene re-branded SEBO uprights under their own name during the early 1980s. In 1986, the SEBO 360 was launched to replace the 350. The 360 had a simple warning light that would notify if there was a brush obstruction or if the disposable filter bag was full.

By 1998, the company celebrated 20 years of SEBO Stein & Co. and the 1,500,000th unit built was a SEBO AUTOMATIC X1. Launched in May 2014, the new SEBO EVOLUTION commercial upright brings further refinements to the existing range.

SEBO's products are offered in two formats, canisters and uprights. The models consist of the 350, 360 and successor 370 models and the BS36/46 models dependent on floor head widths for the commercial and retail market.

=== Upright models ===
==== SEBO Automatic X1/X1.1/X4/X5/X7/X8 ====
In 1991, SEBO began to branch into the domestic market with an upright cleaner known as "Automatic X1" upright and built from commercial components and low-energy release motor. A re-designed version of the earlier 360, the BS36 was also introduced. Other manufacturers offered an integrated attachment hose that would extend for cleaning hard to reach areas or dusting, but the Automatic X1 included a holster wand that was easily removed from the machine and stored simple cleaning attachments on the back.

Featuring a low watt 850 watt motor, computer controlled height adjustment, a lifetime guaranteed drive belt system, S-Class filtration, easy access block-check doors and an easy access brush-roll with shut off mechanism to sense clogs or obstructions, the X1 Automatic is designed to be user/owner repairable. The design continues on with the cosmetic X1.1, X4 and X5 with increased motors from 1150 watts to 1300 watts.

SEBO's commercial machines continued to supply the industry market with commercial products as well as bigger floor head versions such as X2 and X3, two versions that are still available to buy in other European countries. Eventually, the X1A receives a higher motor increase to 1000 watts before it is replaced by the X1.1 in 1999.

The X1.1 remains to be a UK-specific model only compared to the X4 Extra with slightly uprated motor power to 1300 watts. Both models with different colours are available to buy in the UK. A larger "big foot" model based on the X4 was also launched a few years later, called the "X5," available worldwide.

In September 2014, the X series is modified to reduce the maximum motor input power from 1300W to 1100W, and it is known as "X series ECO". X1.1, X4 and X5 all have an 1100 watt motor and only differ from different specs and colours.

In March 2015, SEBO presents the X4 Pet Boost upright with a central push button for deeper cleaning option on carpets and hard floors. Private franchise labels are introduced to exclusive SEBO models such as X4 Pro for Euronics stores and X4 Excel for the British John Lewis Department Stores.

In 2018, Sebo released the Sebo Automatic X7. This vacuum had a different exhaust filter design to the previous X models. It also had a better automatic height adjustment and other upgraded features.

==== SEBO Felix/Dart ====
In 2005, SEBO launched the "swivel neck" upright, which meant the connector to the motorized brush cleaning unit could turn aiding in flexibility. The SEBO Dart, aimed at the commercial market and its domestic equivalent, the Felix with additional features that domestic customers demand, to include interchangeable floor heads or a power nozzle that are available for both machines to deal with various floor types. The floorhead/powerhead can also be removed from the main body, and the handle folded down to convert the unit into a portable, handheld cleaner in a canister mode.

The powerhead fitted to all Felix models (Not Dart) is the ET-1 (premium) type which has a foot pedal recline similar to the X series. The ET1 features a manual 4 position height adjustment dial to suit different flooring types. LED control panel indicates brush roll monitoring at all times if height adjustment is set too high and automatic shut off the motor if brush roll becomes obstructed, strained or jammed. The brush roll motor can be switched off manually for use on hard floors, and automatically shuts off when the machine is in the upright locked position. Like the X series, the brush roll can be easily removed for cleaning or replacement.

In 2010, SEBO introduces the "DISCO" polisher buffer. With an optional hard floor round crystal and polishing discs for polishing and cleaning hard floors, the DISCO head can be used with both Felix and Dart models. The Dart 3 comes as a package with the Disco head. Other than a similar attachment for Kirby Vacuum Cleaners, the Felix/Dart is the only machine offering this feature.

The Dart 1 and Dart 2 machines feature a similar power head range to the Felix, and in 2 widths, 31 cm, and 37 cm (similar to the commercial BS36 and BS46 and SM1/SM2) but no facility to shut off brush roll is offered for longevity of usage in commercial areas.

The Dart 4 is supplied with the SEBO "Kombi" floor head and offers variable suction control. Other versions of Dart has fixed suction.

All models feature a 3.5 litre bag capacity and piston bag full indicator set into the lid of the bag housing.

A unique feature of the Felix and the Dart is that the main exhaust filter also forms the covering of the bag compartment, and on the Felix, can be customised with different colour fabric designs. Sebo supply a 3 layer electrostatic fabric disposable bag for the Felix/Dart, which is an improvement on earlier paper bags.

The original SEBO Felix/Dart is rated at 1300W for the suction motor and 175W for the powerhead motor.

The new EU directive for reducing vacuum cleaner wattage from September 2014 means a whole re-launch for SEBO products. Felix & Dart are fitted with 700 watts for the domestic market and 1000 watt Dart models for the commercial markets.

A new F9 filter has been redesigned and fitted to the SEBO Felix Pet, designed to give heat protection and increased allergen retention.

==== SEBO Evolution 300/350/450 ====
Launched in 2014, consisting of three (Evolution 300, 350 and 450) models with varying cleaning widths, this range is literally an "evolution" of the old BS36/46 commercial, incorporating refreshed styling similar to the BS36/46, but differences include a power on/off kick switch on the side of the cleaner head, single motor, and re-designed cord replacement. In the UK, this range replaces the 370 Comfort uprights.

==== SEBO Cordless SoftCase BP60 ====
In 2022, Sebo revealed the SoftCase BP60 at the Interclean floor show in Amsterdam. It is a cordless, battery-powered upright vacuum with a soft outer bag.

=== Canister models ===
==== SEBO Airbelt C ====
SEBO's first cylinder/canister vacuum cleaner for the domestic market, the C series was launched in 1995 and though cited as a main rival to Miele and other premium brands, the C series offered an eco-friendly 1500 watt motor when most of the rivals had much more powerful motors. Equipped with an award-winning Ergo-handle and a highly efficient filter system called "AirBelt," the C series quickly became a worldwide success. The AirBelt design acts to diffuse clean air from the main filters on board the vacuum and emits clean air from the sides of the vacuum cleaner as opposed to the top of the vacuum that can affect the breathing of the owner at time of usage.

With a foot-operated roller suction dial and a comfort handle, also copied by Miele on their later machines, SEBO's highly compact C series also uses the X series large disposable dust bag, loaded from underneath the machine to cut costs and extend accessibility. The design amasses awards from the Good Housekeeping Institute and was the first cylinder vacuum on the market to be credited with the British Allergy Foundation seal of approval among other organisations. By using the same capacity large dust bag as the X1 Automatic upright, this feature allowed buyers to independently choose between an upright vacuum or a more compact cylinder vacuum. Eventually SEBO launched the C1, C2.1 and premium C3 series with an electric power nozzle floor head, known as "ET-H." The C Series is long discontinued, but parts and accessories are still available.

==== SEBO Airbelt K ====
The K1 and K3 series "compact" cylinder vacuum was launched in 2002, designed to offer domestic homes with a smaller version of the C series. Using a four layer filtration 3 litre dust bag, (also with the bag door forming part of the underside of the machine) and similar Hospital grade filter system developed on the C series, the K series was also awarded with the British Allergy Foundation seal of approval and carried on with the AirBelt Clean Air diffuser design. Unlike the C series, the K series has only 3 swivel castors. The K is designed to be space efficient and smaller than the C series. Initially fitted with an 1800 watt motor to compete in the market with rivals and featured a new 500gram lighter tube and hose system earned design awards for this model. Also equipped with a longer domestic market hose and 6 metres of cable length, the K series remains popular.

SEBO further offered the K1 "Komfort" featuring two different floor heads - a parquet head and full size turbo brush; the K1 "Pet" which included a turbo mini head and full size turbo brush, (but no specific head for hard floors); the K3 "Vulcano" with a remote electronic suction control added to the handle grip and supplied with the Deluxe Kombi head plus the full size turbo brush, and a small dusting brush; and the K3 "Premium" top of the range model, with remote control handle grip, dusting brush and an electric ET-H power head similar to the C3. As from early 2014, SEBO have now started supplying the K3 Premium with the later ET-1 powerhead which is fitted to the current Felix range, and the D4 Premium.

All models in the K series have an orange bag full indicator light, and the Vulcano and Premium models also have a green "mains on" / standby light. K1 models have a lightweight crushproof hose that swivels both ends, but the K3 Vulcano and Premium have a heavier electric hose that does not swivel at the machine end, so does tend to be a slightly more unwieldy in use.

In 2011, SEBO further enhanced the K series with a longer 2.1 metre hose on higher variant models (Komfort, Pet, Vulcano and Premium) and 1.8 metres on the red base model K1 Airbelt. Later, 1800 watts remained the standard for the base level K1 Airbelt, whilst 2100 watt motors were fitted to all other K models, to compete with Miele's 2200 watt vacuums.

To conform to EU Directive (EU) No 666/2013 of 8 July 2013, SEBO launched an updated K1 Eco Comfort Plus with a 700 watt motor to comply with the impending EU law requiring vacuum cleaners to be limited to 1600 watts (from Sept 2014) and later (by 2017) to 900 watts. The K3 Vulcano variant is discontinued in September 2014, following the new ECO range introduction, although SEBO have launched both 1200 watt models alongside the 700 watt models.

==== SEBO Airbelt D ====
In 2010, SEBO replaced the C series vacuum with the D1, D2, D3 and D4 series - the largest cylinder vacuum SEBO has ever produced for the domestic market and specifically designed for large homes. Designed in collaboration with Achim Heine, Professor of product design and member of the German Design Council, whose timeless design is famous with Braun's small appliances, this innovative new vacuum emanates form and function, led by SEBO's original design knowledge. For example, the circular front, with its patented air belt bumper, is ideal for negotiating obstacles, houses an easy to remove filter inside, and allows a large capacity 6-litre disposable high filtration dust bag. An extra long 12m cable contributes to an incredible 15.5m cleaning range, twice the cord length that other German brands supply.

To give maximum performance the air path has been optimised, and a cone-shaped hose has also been used, which improves suction and prevents clogging. A new turbofan motor uses the latest turbine technology to give superlative cleaning power that reduces motor noise and the vacuum carries on with the famous AirBelt clean air diffuser bumper as well as protecting both the vacuum and general usage in a home.

Red Dot Award and other organisations have approved the Airbelt D model for its filtration design and usage. SEBO also add the ET-1 power head option and handle remote control with the white D4 model called the "D4 Premium", and in late 2011, a commercial version known as the "Professional D" is also launched with a pigtail interchangeable industry manual cord, low eco-friendly 1200 watt motor, and a design specifically catered for the commercial market.

The D4 Premium also features a unique novel ring of blue LED's around the control dial that highlights visual suction speed according to motor speed. Lower models such as the D2 Storm, D2 Titan, and D2 Total only have a single LED next to the rotary power adjustment knob to indicate power on status. The D series features a mechanical piston bag full indicator next to the hose outlet, and 4 swivel castors on the underside for maximum movement in space restricted areas.

As of March 2014, most UK domestic models of the D series including the D4 Premium are fitted with a 2100W motor. To comply with the EU directive, the latest D2 series from SEBO features a range of 700 watt or 1200 watt models to replace older 1600 watt/2100 watt models. The ET-1 power nozzle remains unchanged rated at 175 watts. In other countries and Germany, the D1 and D3 series offer several different permutations including a lower energy model with 1200 watts.

==== SEBO Airbelt E ====
Designed with a German design specialist, the E Airbelt cylinder vacuum features a 3.5 litre dust capacity, lightweight and space efficient design with a one touch cord rewind, a motor protection system built in and a new filtration system. It is intended to eventually replace the AIRBELT K series compact vacuum and will be available in E1 and E3 models. Models with 700 watts and 1200 watts are available, as is the E3 Premium with ET-1 power nozzle. The E3's fan motor and tapered suction hose design are similar to the D3

=== Cordless Stick Models ===
==== SEBO Balance A1 ====
In 2025, SEBO released a cordless stick vacuum that they call the Balance A1. This has many firsts for SEBO. It is the first SEBO stick vacuum, the first SEBO bagless vacuum, and the first SEBO to be made outside of Europe, or Germany for that matter. It uses "Innovative SEBO Cyclone Technology" and uses "High-Quality Microfiltration" which meets the EPA 10 standard. It also utilizes a brushless motor that they claim has over 100,000 rpm. Although SEBO claim it uses German engineering and design, many people think it looks like most other, uninspired, Chinese no-name stick vacuums, which puts the validity of their claim into question. This becomes very apparent when it is considered that its design is a lot closer to a Dyson V-series stick vacuum than anything, past or present, that SEBO has released.

== SEBO Duo Cleaning System ==
In addition to their vacuum cleaners, SEBO also offer a dry powder cleaning agent for carpets called Duo P. This powder can be distributed across carpet using a sprinkler dispenser, and scrubbed into the carpet with a brush or the SEBO Duo Daisy, which is a wheeled long handled brush, for easier distribution of the powder.

After the powder has been allowed to permeate the carpet fibres for an hour, it can be vacuumed up, with any vacuum cleaner. Alternatively, the motorized SEBO Duo cleaning machine can be used, which achieves the best results on large areas of carpet.

== Awards and accolades ==
SEBO has routinely ranked highly in tests by Australian consumer group CHOICE Magazine for the performance of its vacuum cleaners. Since 2011, the SEBO K3 Premium has received yearly recommendations by the group.

== Milestones ==
- 1978 Stein & Co. GmbH is registered and the trademark SEBO is created.
- 1978 SEBO 350 introduced.
- 1979 Distribution expanded to the USA (Commercial), supplied by Windsor Industries.
- 1983 Distribution expanded to Austria, UK, South Africa and France.
- 1984 SEBO Duo P introduced. Electrostatic micro filtration introduced.
- 1986 SEBO 360 introduced.
- 1991 SEBO X1 introduced.
- 1991 SEBO BS36/46 introduced.
- 1993 SEBO X2, X3 introduced.
- 1995 SEBO C1 and C2 introduced.
- 1995 Distribution expanded to Australia and Korea.
- 1997 SEBO 370 introduced.
- 1997 SEBO C3 introduced. ET-H power head introduced.
- 1999 Distribution expanded to the USA (Retail) under SEBO America.
- 1999 SEBO X1 reintroduced as X1.1.
- 2002 SEBO G1, G2, K1 and K3 introduced.
- 2004 SEBO Dart introduced in the US, by Windsor Industries, as the Windsor Flexamatic.
- 2005 SEBO Dart and Felix introduced.
- 2006 SEBO K3 Vulcano introduced.
- 2007 SEBO Disco and Dart 3 introduced.
- 2008 SEBO Felix Pet and K1 Pet introduced.
- 2009 SEBO X4 Pet introduced. SEBO K1 Cappuccino (Eco 1500) introduced in the UK.
- 2010 SEBO D1, D2, D2 Eco, D3 Family, D4 Pet and D4 Premium introduced.
- 2010 New SEBO Felix styles introduced (Crystal, Rosso, Vogue).
- 2010 SEBO Dart UHS introduced.
- 2011 SEBO D6, D7 and D8 introduced.
- 2012 New SEBO Felix styles introduced (Stars & Stripes, Berlin, Royale, Deutschland).
- 2012 SEBO X4 Excel introduced (Exclusive to John Lewis stores).
- 2012 SEBO 370/470 and BS36/46 redesigned.
- 2012 SEBO K1 and X4 Pro introduced (Exclusive to Euronics stores).
- 2013 SEBO D2 Eco introduced.
- 2014 SEBO X4 Excel introduced (Exclusive to John Lewis stores).
- 2014 SEBO Evolution 300 introduced.
- 2014 SEBO Eco range introduced. Includes lower-powered variants of several SEBO vacuum cleaners.
- 2015 SEBO E3 Premium, E1, E1 Plus, E1 Komfort and E1 Pet introduced.
- 2015 SEBO Felix Kudos introduced (Exclusive to Euronics stores).
- 2015 SEBO X4 Pet Boost and E1 Pro introduced.
- 2015 SEBO E1 Excel introduced (Exclusive to John Lewis stores).
- 2015 SEBO E3 Premium, E1 Sapphire introduced in Germany.
- 2023 SEBO E3 Premium, E3 Komfort and E1 Turbo introduced in Australia.
