= Dry carpet cleaning =

Carpet cleaning with chemical technologies

Dry carpet cleaning involves the use of specialized machines to clean carpets with recently developed chemical technologies that permit no-moisture or "very low moisture" (VLM) cleaning, resulting in carpet beautification, and removal of stains, dirt, grit, sand, and allergens. Clean carpets are recognized by manufacturers as being more visually pleasing, potentially longer-lasting and probably healthier than poorly maintained carpets.

Carpet cleaning is reportedly widely misunderstood, and chemical developers have only within recent decades created new carpet care technologies. Particularly, encapsulation and other green technologies work better, are easier to use, require less training, save more time and money, and lead to less re-soiling than prior methods. Dry carpet cleaning can also aid in achieving U.S. Green Building Council Leadership in Energy and Design (LEED) certification.

== Processes ==
Dry carpet cleaning systems are more accurately known as "very low moisture" (VLM) systems, relying on dry compounds complemented by application cleaning solutions, and are growing significantly in market share due in part to their very rapid drying time, a significant factor for 24-hour commercial installations. Dry-cleaning and "very low moisture" systems are also often faster and less labor-intensive than wet-extraction systems.

Pre-treatments, pre-conditioners, or "traffic-lane cleaners", which are detergents or emulsifiers that break the binding of soils to carpet fibers over a short period of time, are commonly sprayed onto carpet prior to the primary use of the dry-cleaning system. One chemical dissolves the greasy films that bind soils and prevent effective soil removal by vacuuming. The solution may add a solvent like d-limonene, petroleum byproducts, glycol ethers, or butyl agents. The amount of time the pretreatment "dwells" in the carpet should be less than 15 minutes, due to the thorough carpet brushing common to these "very low moisture" systems, which provides added agitation to ensure the pretreatment works fully through the carpet.

=== Dry compound ===
An absorbent, 98% biodegradable cleaning compound may be spread evenly over carpet and brushed or scrubbed in. For small areas, a household hand brush can work such a compound into carpet pile; dirt and grime is attracted to the compound, which is then vacuumed off, leaving carpet immediately clean and dry. For commercial applications, a specially designed cylindrical counter-rotating brushing system is used, without a vacuum cleaner. Machine scrubbing is more typical, in that hand scrubbing generally cleans only the top third of carpet.

=== Encapsulation ===
In the 1990s, new polymers began literally encapsulating (crystallizing) soil particles into dry residues on contact, in a process now regarded by the industry as a growing, up-and-coming technology; working like "tiny sponges", the deep-cleaning compound crystals dissolve and absorb dirt prior to its removal from the carpet. Cleaning solution is applied by rotary machine, "CRB" counter rotating brush, brush applicator, or compression sprayer. Dry residue is vacuumable immediately, either separately or from a built-in unit of the cleaning system machine. According to ICS Cleaning Specialist, evidence suggests encapsulation improves carpet appearance, compared to other systems; and it is favorable in terms of high-traffic needs, operator training, equipment expense, and lack of wet residue. Encapsulation carpet cleaning also keeps carpets cleaner for longer periods of time compared to other methods. Encapsulation also avoids the drying time of carpet shampoos, making the carpet immediately available for use.

The use of encapsulation to create a crystalline residue that can be immediately vacuumed (as opposed to the dry powder residue of wet-cleaning systems, which generally requires an additional day before vacuuming) is a newer technology that has recently become an accepted method for commercial and residential carpet deep cleaning.

=== Bonnet ===
After cleaning product in solution is deposited onto the surface as mist, a round buffer or "bonnet" scrubs the mixture with rotating motion. This industry machine resembles a floor buffer, with an absorbent spin pad that attracts soil and is rinsed or replaced repeatedly. The bonnet method is not strictly dry-cleaning and involves short drying time, making it a solution for a deep cleaning of dirt or odor as considered suitable for valuable carpet. To reduce pile distortion, the absorbent pad should be kept well-lubricated with cleaning solution.

=== Solvent extraction ===
A d-limonene based cleaner is pre-sprayed upon the carpet to be cleaned. The product is given a dwell time of 5–10 minutes. The carpet is then extracted using an acid rinse solution through a hot water extraction machine. Triple dry strokes are then performed to ensure a low dry time. While this process is not strictly dry cleaning and involves a 1-4 hour dry time, it cleans deep into the fibers.
