= Sebo (name) =

Sebo is both a given name and surname. Notable people with the name include:

- Sebo Colloredo (born 1987), Italian ski jumper
- Sebo Shahbazian (born 1980), Iranian footballer
- Sebő Vukovics (1811–1872), Hungarian politician
- Sebo Walker (born 1988), American skateboarder
- Ágota Sebő (born 1934), Hungarian swimmer
- András Sebő (born 1954), Hungarian-French mathematician
- Ferenc Sebő (born 1947), Hungarian folklorist and musician
- Filip Šebo (born 1984), Slovak footballer
- Jeff Sebo (born 1983), American philosopher
- Sam Sebo (1906–1933), American football player
- Steve Sebo (1914–1989), American football and baseball player
