= Scouting in Ohio =

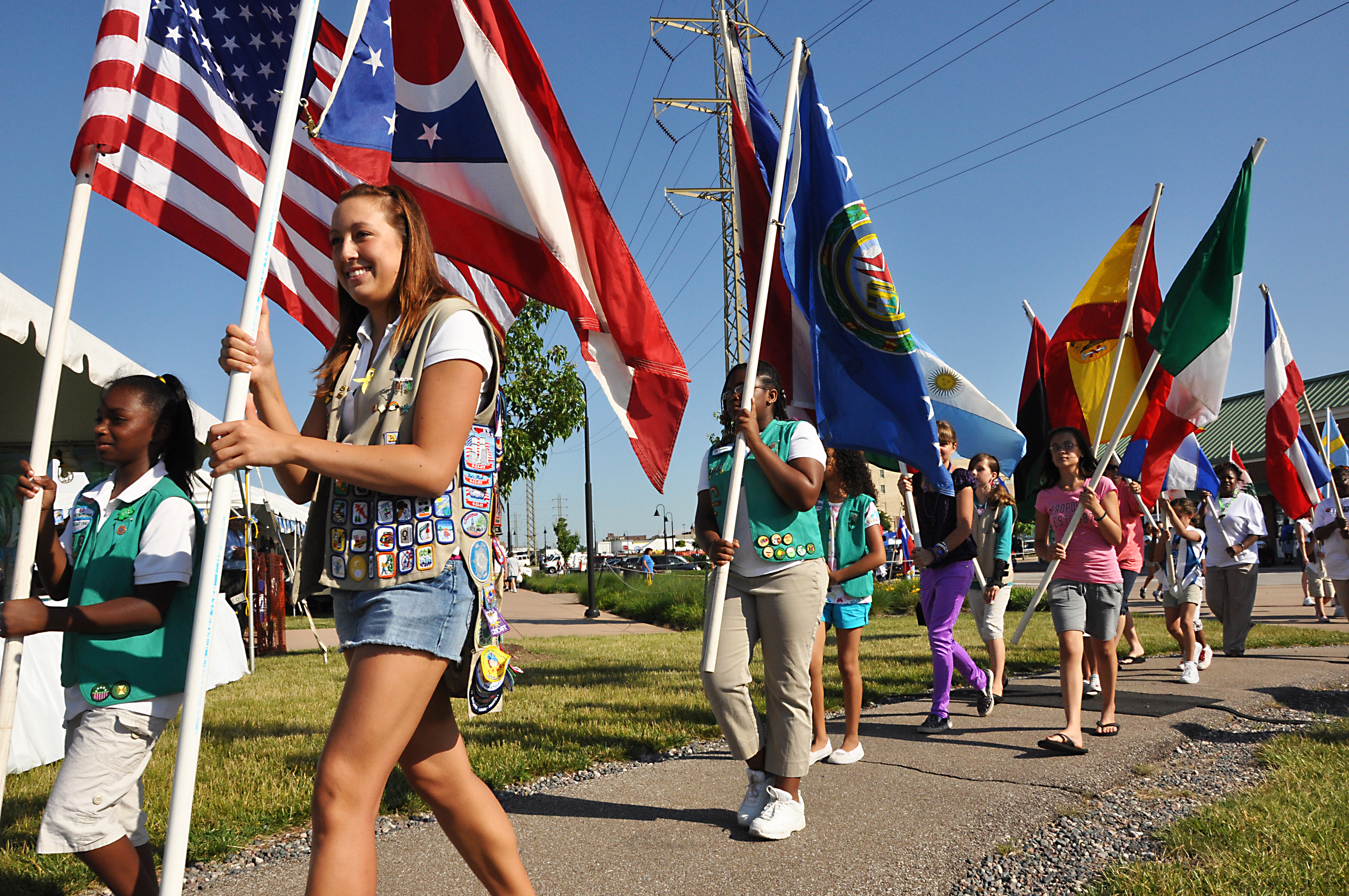
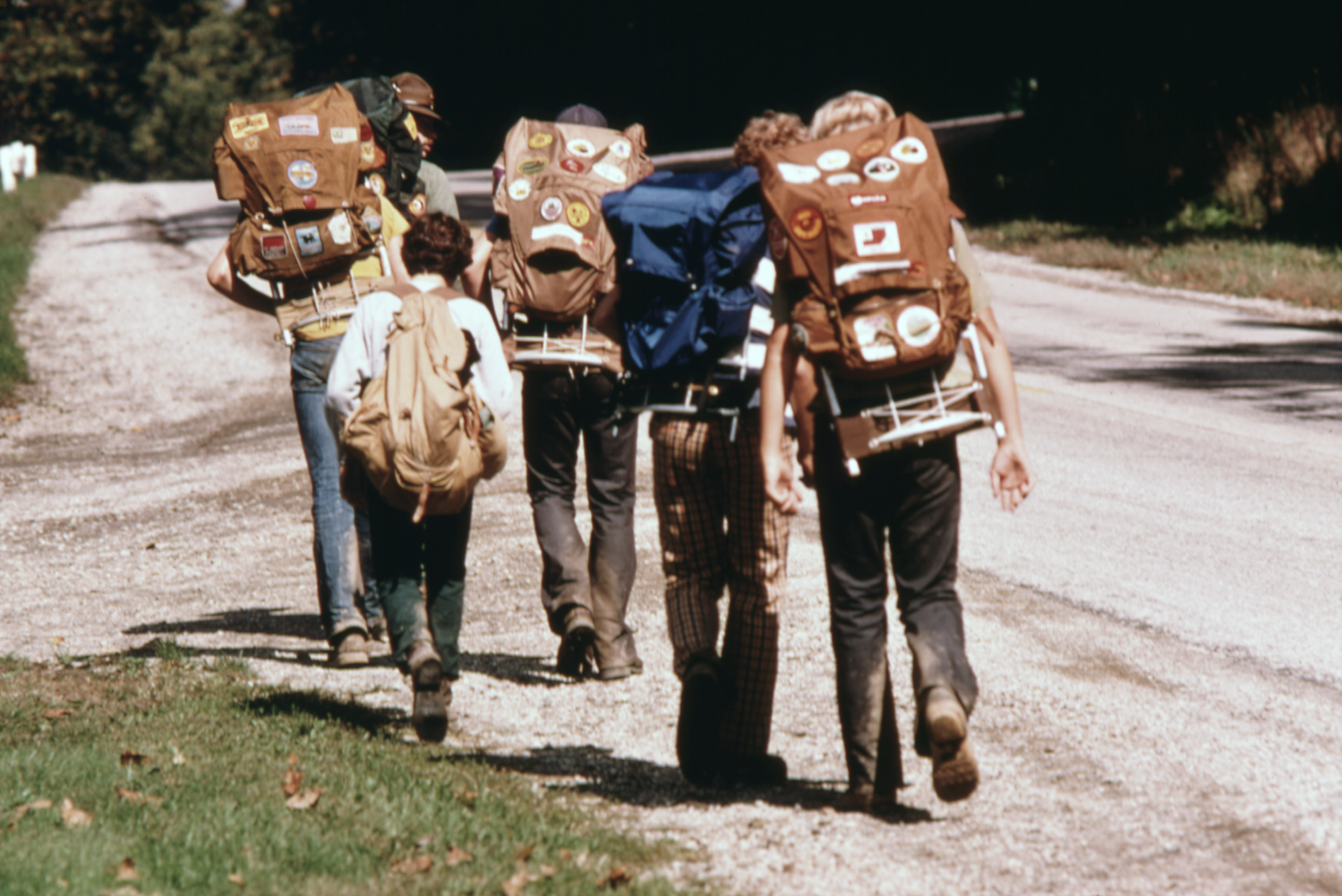
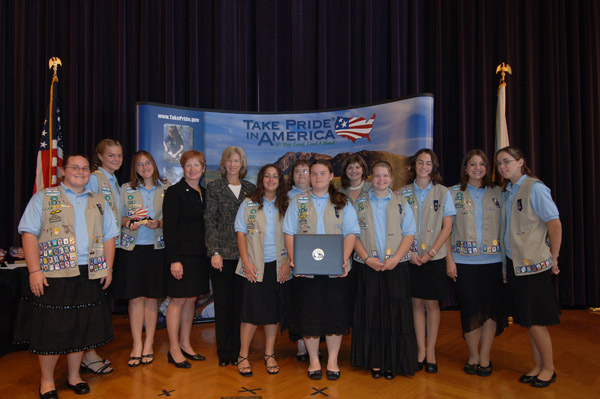
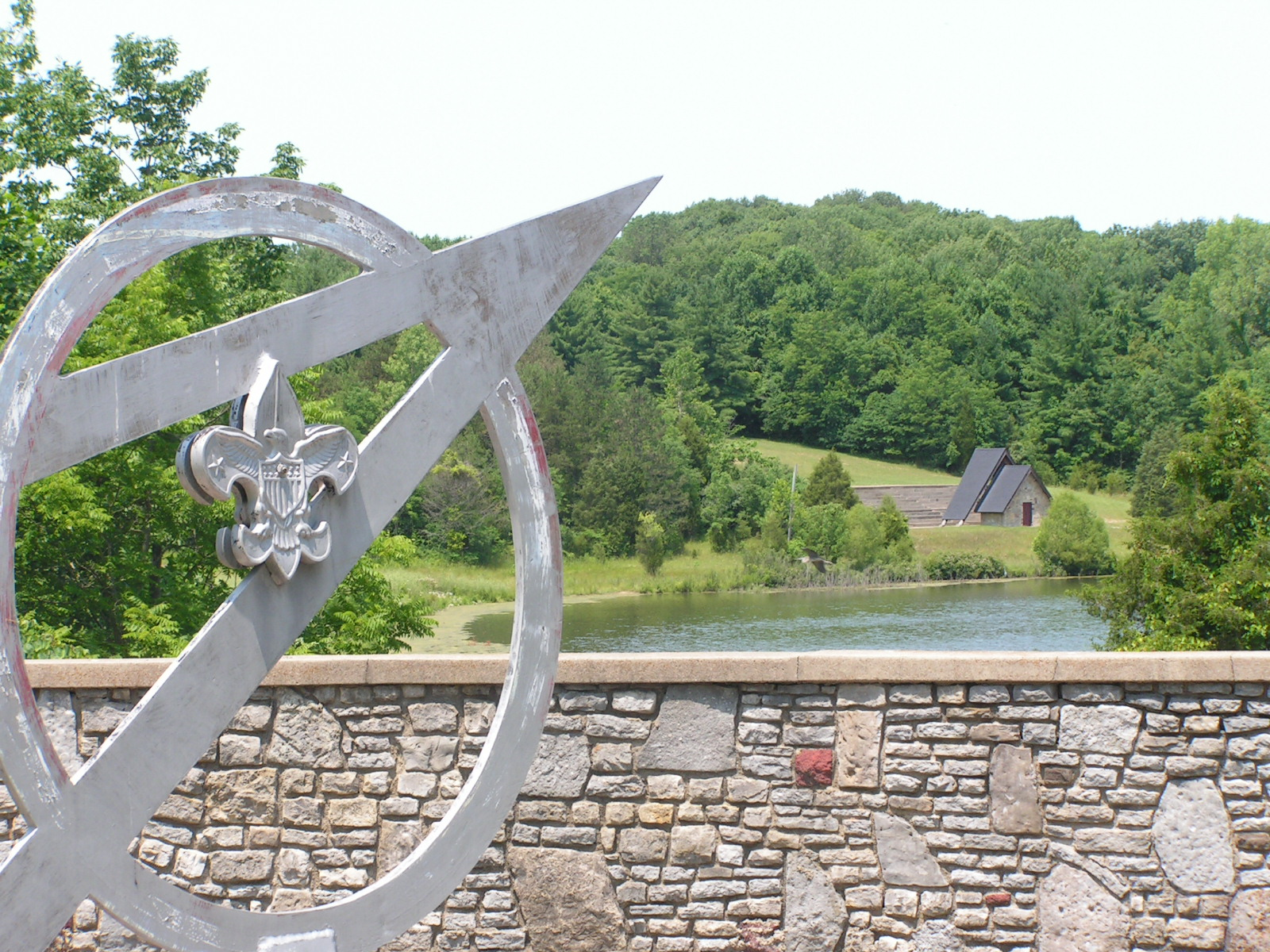
- Girl Scouts at Lorain International Festival Boy Scouts Hiking the Cuyahoga Trail New Concord, Ohio, Girl Scout Troops Woodland Trails Scout Reservation Sundial

Scouting in Ohio has a long history, from the 1908 to the present day, serving thousands of youth in programs that suit the environment in which they live.

== Recent history (1950–1990) ==
In 1952 and again in 1975 the National Order of the Arrow Conference was held at Miami University.

== Present Day (2016-) ==
In 2016, an effort was started to consolidate councils in Northeast Ohio as of January 1, 2017. Heart of Ohio and Greater Western Reserve Councils' northern districts merged with Greater Cleveland Council. Heart of Ohio's southern districts have merged with Buckeye Council. Greater Western Reserve Councils southern districts have merged with Great Trail Council.

Order of the Arrow Lodge mergers will be completed following the Section C-4A conclave in May at Camp Manatoc

== Scouting America in Ohio today ==
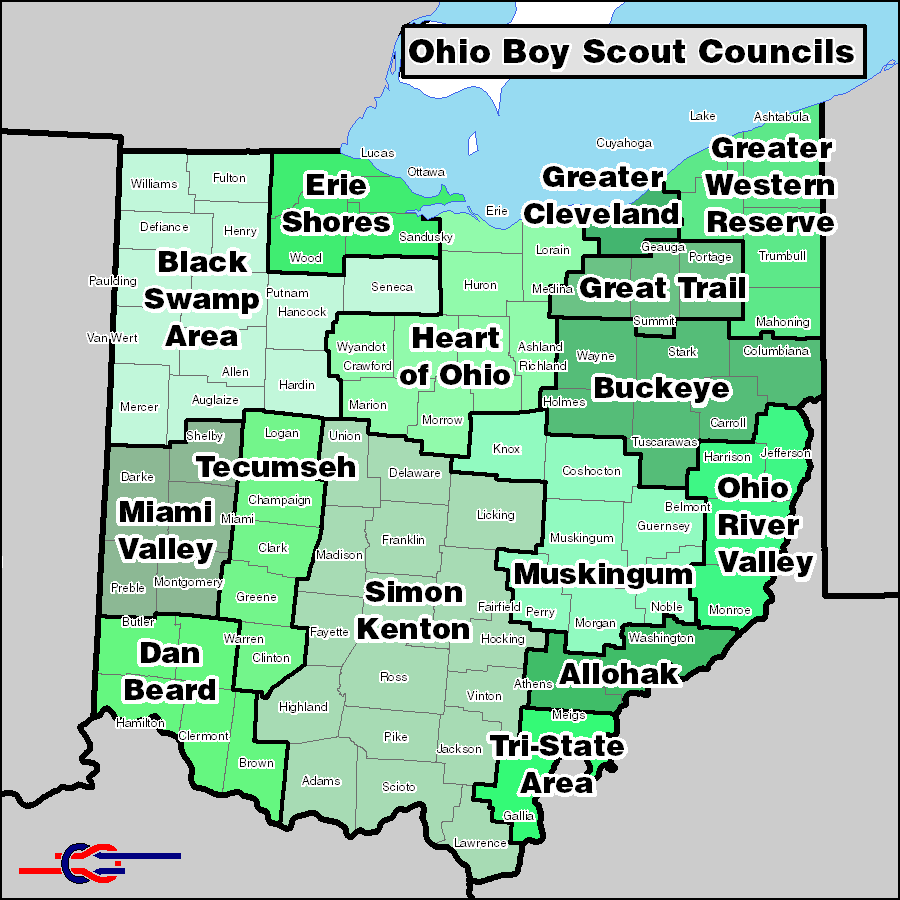
BSA Councils Serving Ohio.

In the 1990s, the Boy Scouts of America (BSA) went through a restructuring in an attempt to reduce manpower, and in several states small historic Councils were merged into a larger supercouncil. The Simon Kenton Council is an example of such a supercouncil.

There are twelve Scouting America local councils in Ohio.

=== Allohak Council ===
Allohak Council (#618)
- Owner: Scouting America
- Headquarters: Parkersburg, West Virginia
- Founded: 1991
- President: Howard Dewald
- Commissioner: Greg Godwin
- Scout Executive: Todd Walter
- Website allohak.org

Allohak Council (#818) was founded in 1991. It was composed of six districts and served parts of West Virginia and Ohio. The council headquarters was in Parkersburg, West Virginia. The Allohak Council was disbanded on December 31, 2018.

=== Black Swamp Area Council ===
Black Swamp Area Council (#449)
- Owner: Scouting America
- Headquarters: Findlay, Ohio
- Founded: 1992
- President: Daniel Meffley
- Commissioner: Michelle Waggoner
- Scout Executive: Marc Kogan
- Website blackswampbsa.org

Black Swamp Area Council was created in 1992. It is composed of six districts and covers thirteen counties in Ohio. The council headquarters is in Findlay.

==== History ====
In 1920, the Defiance Council (#446) was formed, in 1922 the Van Wert Council (#463) was formed, and in 1919 the Lima Council (#452) was formed. In 1926 Defiance, Lima and Van wert merged to form the Shawnee Area Council (#452). In 1923, the Hancock County Council (#449) was formed, and in 1915 the Tiffin Council was formed. In 1930, Hancock County and Tiffin merged to become the Put-Han-Sen Area Council (#449). In 1992, Shawnee Area and Put-Han-Sen Area merged to become the Black Swamp Area Council (#449).

Hancock County Council #449 founded 1923
Put-Han-Sen Area Council #449 merged 1930
Black Swamp Area Council #449 merged January 1, 1992

Tiffin Council founded 1915

Lima Council #452 founded 1919
Shawnee Area Council #452 merged 1926

Defiance Council #446 founded 1920

Van Wert Council #463 founded 1922

==== Organization ====
- Arrowwood District serves Hancock County, Ohio and Seneca County, Ohio.
- Chinquapin District serves Defiance County, Ohio, Fulton County, Ohio, Henry County, Ohio, Paulding County, Ohio and Williams County, Ohio.
- Great Oaks District serves Allen County, Ohio, Hardin County, Ohio and Putnam County, Ohio.
- Old Sycamore District serves Auglaize County, Ohio, Van Wert County, Ohio and Mercer County, Ohio.

==== Camps ====
- Camp Lakota
- Camp Berry

==== Order of the Arrow ====
- Mawat Woakus Lodge

=== Buckeye Council ===
Buckeye Council (#436)
- Owner: Scouting America
- Headquarters: Canton, Ohio
- Founded: 1958
- President: Gene Thorn
- Commissioner: John Fehrenbach
- Scout Executive: Jesse Roper
- Website buckeyecouncil.org

Buckeye Council (#436) serves Ohio and parts of northern West Virginia.

=== Dan Beard Council ===
Dan Beard Council (#438)
- Owner: Scouting America
- Headquarters: Cincinnati, Ohio
- Founded: 1956
- President: Robert C. Taylor
- Commissioner: Doug Siebenburgen
- Scout Executive: Andrew V. Zahn
- Website danbeard.org

Dan Beard Council was created in 1956. It is composed of seven districts and serves Scouts in twelve counties in southern Ohio and northern Kentucky. The council is served by the Ku-Ni-Eh Lodge of the Order of the Arrow.

==== History ====
Cincinnati Area Council #438 founded 1915
Dan Beard Council #438 merged 1956
Dan Beard Council #438 merged 1959
Dan Beard Council #438 merged 1985

Covington Council #201 founded 1916
Northern Kentucky Council #201 renamed 1925
Dan Beard Council #201 renamed 1952

Hamilton Council #448 founded 1919
Butler County Council #448 renamed 1925
Fort Hamilton Council #448 renamed 1935

Middletown Council #454 founded 1917
Mound Builders Area Council #454 renamed 1932

The Middletown Area Council (#454) was first formed as a provisional (second class) council in 1917. In 1920 it was granted full council status. It initially served the city of Middletown. In 1928, the territory of the Middletown Area Council was expanded to include all of Warren County as well as Lemon, Liberty, Madison and Union Townships from Butler County. In 1926, the land for Camp Hook was donated to the council. The camp opened in 1927 and operated until 1991. In 1932 Union Township was transferred to the jurisdiction of the Butler County Council (later known as Fort Hamilton Council). In 1933 the Middletown Area Council was renamed to the Mound Builders Area Council. In 1955, jurisdiction of Lemon Township was transferred to Fort Hamilton Council, forming the final boundaries of the Mound Builders Area Council. Mound Builders Area Council continued to serve Warren County and the Lemon and Madison Townships of Butler County as well as all of Warren County until July 1, 1985, when it was absorbed into Dan Beard Council #438 and became the Mound Builders District. The current Hopewell District of Dan Beard Council, formed during the 2006 redistricting process when Middletown and Lemon Township (including Monroe, Ohio) were recombined, very closely resembling the lines of the old Mound Builders Area Council territory.

Mound Builders Area Council primarily had only two districts, Fort Ancient and Pokey Griffith. A third district, Wischixin, was formed briefly but lasted for less than 5 years before being discontinued.

The Nachenum Lodge #145 of the Order of the Arrow served Mound Builders Area Council, forming in 1939. Upon the merger with Dan Beard Council in 1985, the Ku-Ni-Eh Lodge #462 merged with Nachenum, forming Ku-Ni-Eh Lodge #145 (keeping the existing Dan Beard Council name but choosing to use the lower lodge # of the former Nachenum Lodge).

Mound Builders Area Council, while no longer an actual council, was represented at the 1985 National Jamboree. The troop contingent from Mound Builders Council attended the jamboree, held beginning July 15, while the council itself ceased to exist on July 1. The contingent was technically now part of Dan Beard Council, though all patches and markings, etc. were already set to the old Mound Builders Area Council and were not altered to note Dan Beard Council.

===== Organization =====
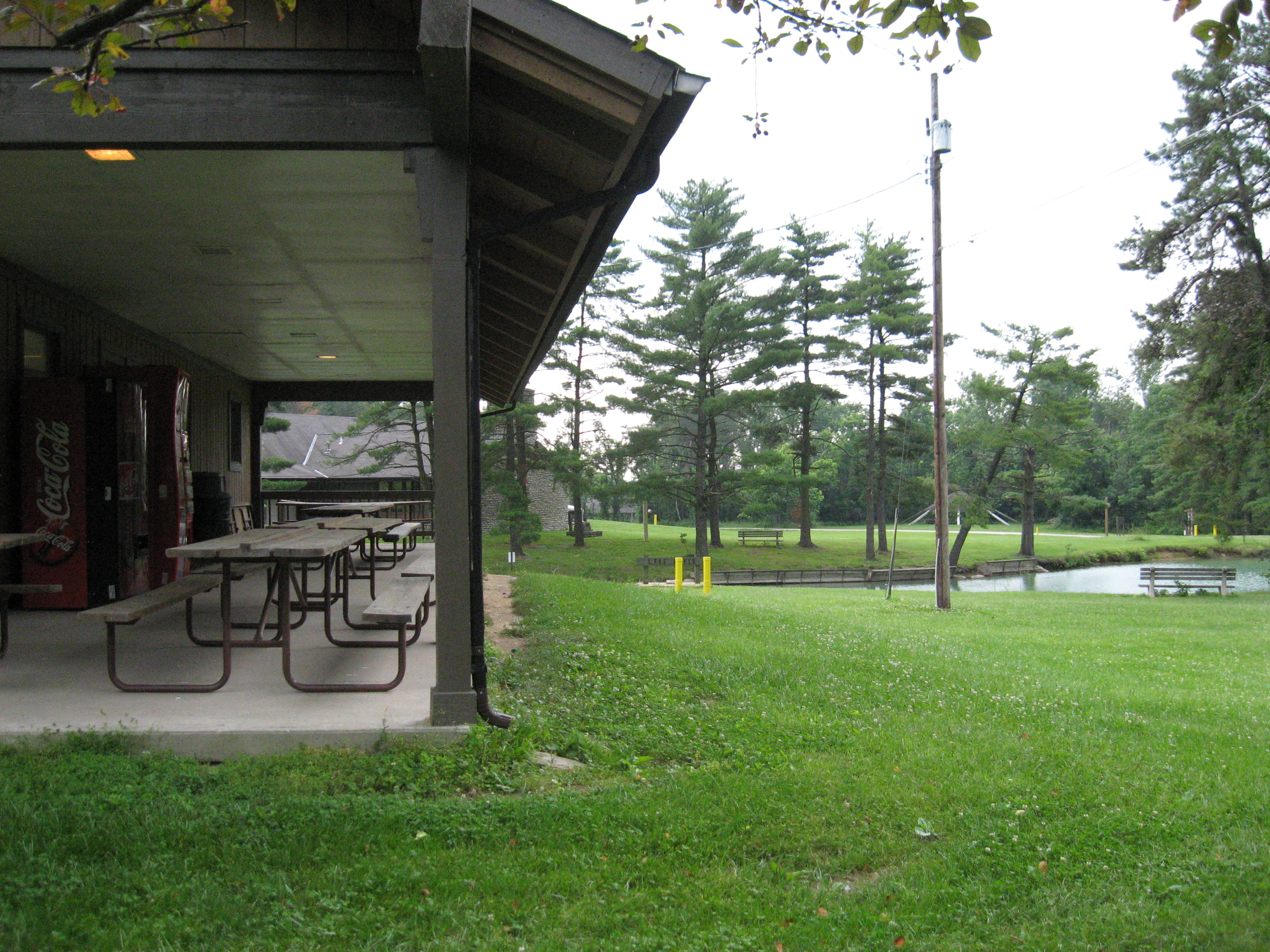
Camp Friedlander

In late 2021, the Dan Beard Council announced a district realignment effort, partly based on local school district boundaries. On February 9, 2022, the new district names were announced.

- Fort Hamilton District (representing Butler County)
- Fort Ancient District (representing Warren County, previously known as Hopewell District)
- Trailblazer District (representing the counties in northern Kentucky)
- East Fork District (representing Clermont and Brown Counties, previously known as U.S. Grant District)

And the 4 districts in Hamilton County (William Henry Harrison, Blue Jacket, Hopkins, and Maketeweh) became

- Little Miami District (representing eastern Hamilton County)
- Whitewater Trails District (representing western Hamilton County)
- Queen City District (representing southern Hamilton County)

===== Camps =====
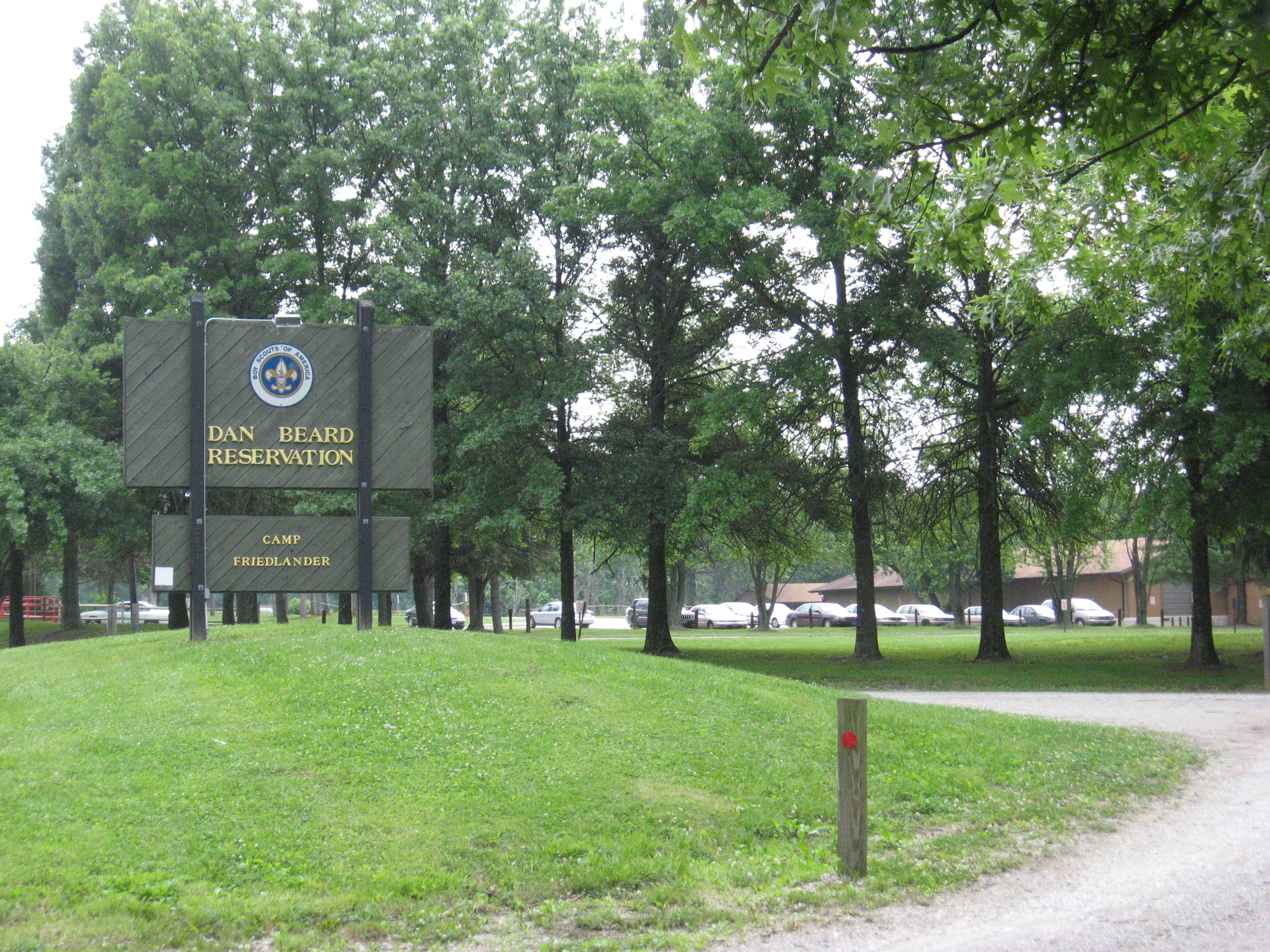
Dan Beard Scout Reservation

Camp Michaels is located in Union, KY, on 700 acres (2.8 km^{2}) of land, offering primitive outdoor facilities. 61 acres (0.25 km^{2}) of additional land was dedicated on September 19, 2008.

The Dan Beard Scout Reservation, in Loveland, OH, consists of three areas on its 506-acre (2.05 km^{2}) campus. Camp Friedlander was established in 1919, and reopened in 2002 after renovations to the camp. Friedlander has 23 campsites, a 600-person dining hall, an 18-acre (73,000 m^{2}) lake, cabins, and a swimming pool. It has an excellent reputation and attracts Scouts from all over the world. Camp Craig is often used as a training facility. The Program Building at Camp Craig is often rented out for retreats, conferences or training. The swimming pool at Camp Craig is shared with Cub World. Cub Scout Adventure World (Cub World) opened in 2000 as a camp designed exclusively for Cub Scouting. Cub World features two large buildings that offer dorm-like accommodations (Pioneer Fort and Medieval Castle) that offer rooms with bunk-beds, and more primitive areas (Mountain Man Village and Miner's Camp) that offer tent camping. All three camps have access to each other on the Reservation, which is adjacent to the Little Miami River.

Camp Charles R. Hook, founded in 1926, was in operation until 1991. In 1997, the land was purchased by the Five Rivers Metroparks and is now called the Twin Creek Metropark. The land for Camp Hook was donated by the family of Charles R. Hook, who was the President of the American Rolling Mill Company (ARMCO) (which in the early 1990s merged to become AK Steel Corporation), and son-in-law of the company's founder, George Matthew Verity. In early 1929 Mr. Hook donated a significant amount of stock to the Middletown Area Council with the instructions to immediately sell it and use the proceeds to put in a swimming pool at the camp. The timing on this event was advantageous considering early in the fall of 1929 was the crash of the stock market and the beginning of the Great Depression. The sale of the stock yielded enough money to put in the swimming pool and purchase more land to the north, expanding the camp's size significantly. The waterfront of the camp was later named Lake George after Charles Hook's son, George Verity Hook. After the camp's closure and sale to the Metroparks system, the majority of the structures were torn down and the swimming pool filled in. Most of the campsites have grown over as well, but many landmarks or signs of the former use of the area remain. The Metroparks system maintains three group campsites for Scout use, and a backcountry camping area was added on the north side of the property near Chamberlain Road. A large rock with embedded plaque thanking the Hooks for the donation remains, as does the amphitheatre campfire bowl, the Administration Lodge, the Maintenance Building, the chapel (now called the Natuary) and a few other structures that are in ruins. The pool pump house and the shelters for the shooting ranges still remain, though it is believed this is due only because the demolition equipment could not safely reach these structures. The park previously held three geocache units that contain historical pictures of the old camp, but as of fall 2013 they have been removed. One point of interest that remains is the Gilwell Tree. A local Scouting family in the 1970s took a vacation to England with his family, during which they visited Gilwell Park, the home of the Scouting movement. A sapling of one of the English Oaks was brought back from Gilwell Park and planted at Camp Hook to signify the ties between Scouting in the US and the worldwide movement. In June, 1986, Camp Hook hosted EC 336 X, an experimental Wood Badge Course directed by William Hillcourt. (Very little is known about this course.) In 2010 a plaque, and a split rail fence were created to honor the tree and one of the leading, and oldest, scout leaders in the council. It was an Eagle Scout Service Project.

===== Trails =====
The Riverwalk Trail spans downtown Cincinnati and Northern Kentucky (Covington and Newport). The trail can be hiked in 2 configurations: the first (5 miles (8.0 km)) meets a requirement for the 2nd Class rank, while the second (10 miles (16 km)) satisfies one of the requirements for the Hiking Merit Badge. Highlights along the trail include the boyhood home of Dan Beard. There is a patch available from the council for walking the trail. The Trail Guide for the Dan Beard Riverwalk Trail can be found on the Dan Beard Council website.

Silver Moccasin patch for the Silver Moccasin Trail in Lebanon, Ohio

The Silver Moccasin Trail originally started in Lebanon and finished at Fort Ancient. It was 14 miles (23 km) long and used to offer a medal and a patch. A portion of the trail was reconstructed from Fort Ancient south to Morgan's Riverside Campground off of Mason-Morrow-Millgrove Rd, then crossing the Little Miami River to join the Little Miami Scenic Trail to complete the loop. This restored loop is 5.1 miles (8.2 km) long. The Thunderbird Trail existed as a 6-mile (9.7-km) long loop around Camp Hook. It was in use for many years during the camp's time as a part of Mound Builders Area Council and Dan Beard Council. Scouts could earn a patch upon completing the entire trail. After the sale of the camp to the Five Rivers MetroParks system in 1997, the Thunderbird trail stopped being maintained and now no longer exists except to those who remember exactly where it was, although the trail markers and Order of the Arrow (OA) fire-rings are still visible and somewhat accessible.

==== Order of the Arrow ====
Tribe of Ku-Ni-Eh (pre-OA honor society); Cincinnati Area Council founded 1922
Ku-Ni-Eh Lodge #462 founded 1951
Ku-Ni-Eh Lodge #462 absorbed 1956
Ku-Ni-Eh Lodge #462 absorbed 1959
Ku-Ni-Eh Lodge #145 founded by merger 1985

Nipperine Lodge #155; Northern Kentucky Council founded 1939
Michikinaqua Lodge #155 renamed 1953

Michi-Kini-Kwa #306; Fort Hamilton Council founded 1945

Nachenum Lodge #145; Mound Builders Council founded 1939

The Ku-Ni-Eh Lodge #145 was originally a pre-OA society called the Tribe of Ku-Ni-Eh, founded in 1922 at Camp Friedlander by then Camp Director Arther E. Roberts. Ku-Ni-Eh means "Order of Manood" in the Maidu tongue. It became popular throughout the region and was incorporated at other camps. However, it was not officially recognized by the BSA National organization, and eventually was phased out for the Order of the Arrow. In 1951, the original Tribe of Ku-Ni-Eh group at the Cincinnati Area Council converted to become the Order of the Arrow Lodge #462.

It remained Ku-Ni-Eh Lodge #462 after the Cincinnati Council merged with the Northern Kentucky Council to become Dan Beard Council in 1956, absorbing Michikinaqua Lodge #155, and again absorbing Mich-Kini-Kwa Lodge #306 when Fort Hamilton Council was merged with Dan Beard Council in 1959.

When Mound Builders Area Council merged with Dan Beard Council in 1985, it was decided to keep the Ku-Ni-Eh name, but use the Nachenum Lodge's lower number of #145, resulting in the founding of Ku-Ni-Eh #145.

Today Ku-Ni-Eh Lodge #145 serves the scouts and scouters of Dan Beard Council and calls Camp Friedlander its home. It typically performs three Ordeal ceremonies per year, with one being held at Dan Beard's northern Kentucky property, Camp Michaels.

With the reorganization of the National OA structure in 2022, Ku-Ni-Eh lodge was moved from Section C-6B to section E-2.

=== Buckskin Council ===
Buckskin Council (#617)
- Owner: Scouting America
- Headquarters: Charleston, West Virginia
- Founded: 1919
- Scout Executive: Jeffrey L. Purdy
- Website buckskin.org

Buckskin Council serves Scouts in Scouts in Kentucky, Ohio, Virginia and West Virginia. It is headquartered in Charleston, West Virginia.

=== Erie Shores Council ===
Erie Shores Council (#460)
- Owner: Scouting America
- Headquarters: Toledo, Ohio
- Founded: 1929
- Scout Executive: Edward Caldwell
- Website erieshorescouncil.org

Erie Shores Council (#460) was created in 1929. It provides Scouting programs to the youth of Northwest Ohio in Lucas, Ottawa, Sandusky, Wood and eastern Fulton Counties.

==== History ====
Toledo Council #460 founded 1915
Maumee Valley Council #460 renamed 1925
Toledo Area Council #460 merged 1929
Erie Shores Council #460 renamed June 1, 1999

Sandusky County Council #447 founded 1919
Hayes Area Council #447 renamed 1925

==== Organization ====
- Commodore Perry District
- Eagle Bay District
- Northwest District
- Swan Creek District
- Wood District

==== Camps ====
- Camp Miakonda
- Camp Frontier, part of Pioneer Scout Reservation

==== Order of the Arrow ====
- Tindeuchen Lodge #522

=== French Creek Council ===
French Creek Council (#532)
- Owner: Scouting America
- Headquarters: Erie, Pennsylvania
- Founded: 1972
- Scout Executive: Duane Havard
- Website frenchcreek-bsa.org

The French Creek Council serves Boy Scouts in six counties in northwestern Pennsylvania and one township in Ohio. The council was organized in 1972 from a merger of the former Washington Trail Council of Erie, Custaloga Council of Sharon and Colonel Drake Council of Oil City, Pennsylvania. It has headquarters in Erie, Pennsylvania.

== Camps ==
The French Creek Council owns and operates a 525-acre (2.12 km^{2}) facility known as Custaloga Town Scout Reservation, located along French Creek in Mercer and Venango counties.

=== Great Trail Council ===
Great Trail Council (#433)
- Owner: Scouting America
- Headquarters: Stow, Ohio
- Founded: 1921
- President: Lisa Testa
- Commissioner: John Judge
- Scout Executive: Patrick Scherer
- Website gtcscouting.org

Great Trail Council (#433) was created in 1921 as the Akron Area Council. It is composed of 4 districts and serves Summit, Portage, Medina, Trumbull, Mahoning, and northern Wayne Counties. At the start of 2017 the southern counties of the Greater Western Reserve Council were merged into the Great Trail Council.

==== History ====
Akron Area Council #433 founded 1921
Great Trail Council #433 renamed 1971

==== Organization ====
- Canal District
- Crooked River District
- Soaring Eagle District
- Stambaugh District

==== Camps ====
The council operates the Manatoc Scout Reservation, containing Camp Manatoc and Camp Butler. The council summer camp program is housed at Camp Manatoc. The council also inherited Camp Stambaugh in Canfield with the consolidation of Greater Western Reserve Council. Camp Stambaugh will host weekend camping, training, and Cub Scout events.

==== Order of the Arrow ====
Great Trail Council is served by the Marnoc OA Lodge #151.

=== Lake Erie Council ===
Lake Erie Council (#440)
- Owner: Scouting America
- Headquarters: Cleveland, Ohio
- Founded: 2017
- Scout Executive: Marc Ryan
- Website lecbsa.org

Lake Erie Council (#440) was created in 1912 as the Cleveland Council. It is composed of four service areas and serves northeastern Ohio. The council headquarters is in Cleveland, Ohio. This was the former Greater Cleveland Council. The council merged with the northern counties of both Heart of Ohio Council and Greater Western Reserve Council.

==== History ====
Cleveland Council #440 founded 1912	Cuyahoga Falls Council #443 founded 1921
Greater Cleveland Council #440 merged 1929
Lake Erie Council #440 merger in 2017, GWRC, Heart of Ohio & Greater Cleveland

==== Organization ====
- Western Trails District
- Central District
- Tinkers Creek District
- Grand River District
- Headwaters District
- Firelands District
- Great Frontier District
- Exploring District

==== Camps ====
Beaumont Scout Reservation (Ohio) is a full-service Scout Reservation with forests, fields, wetlands and lakes, sitting on 1,260 acres (510 ha) along the Grand River in Rock Creek, Ohio, approximately 40 miles east from downtown Cleveland, Ohio. It began operating as a camp in 1946 and has grown into a year-round facility with camping for Scouts and families.

- Camp McIntosh features 12 lodges sleeping 24–36 with full kitchens and heat and pot belly stoves. It also houses the camp's swimming pool and the McIntosh Activity Center.
- Camp Broadbent features 11 tent campsites, a Broadbent Shower House (New 2025), the trading post (BeauMart), a climbing tower, a High and Low COPE course, Garrison Family Archery Range (New 2024), Hill N'Dale Shotgun Range (New 2025) and Brandenburg Rifle Ranges (New 2023), Neshkin Amphitheater, Harding Health Lodge, Harding Health Pavilion, Moritz Family Program Center (New 2020) and Environmental Resource Center. During April–October, an additional 8 family cabins are available with bathrooms, heat and small kitchens sleeping 6. The area also features Lake Klein, which supports fishing, boating, ziplines, and jetskis, offered during Summer Camp. The Mouse House from Camp Stigwandish that was located next to the Quartermasters Building moved from South Chagrin Scout Reservation burned down in the summer of 2025. This was home to metal working.
- Camp McCahill features 11 tent campsites and a reception building. McCahill is also home to the ATV Program and BeauTech program areas. Puddies Puddle and Garrison Family Lake are located in this sub camp as well. The Dedinsky Family Retreat (West Lodge) is the only cabin in McCahill.
- Camp Gray is a separate camp within Beaumont Scout Reservation designed especially for the Cub Scout camper. The area features a Climbing Fort, Harding Family Barm (Home to Beau AG) Baseball Diamond, Sledding Hill, Shooting Ranges, Basketball Court, Garrison Pavilion, and Camp Gray Activity Center. For the Lake Erie Council, it is the home base for all Cub activities. The Cub Activity Center features a large area for inside events and crafts, as well as a full kitchen, heated and flush facilities. The Activity Center is available for unit or event rental, but is not designed for overnight accommodations. The Pavilion has picnic tables for 150+, electric lights and a fire ring on its south side. The area has both a covered Archery and BB Gun Range for Tiger Cubs to Webelos Scouts. Beginning in 2012, both ranges have electricity and lighting.
- Beaumont Village is a family-style campground within Beaumont Scout Reservation available to Scout and non-Scout groups, with accommodations for RVs and Tents, and also contains a picnic shelter and full shower facilities.
- The Augustus Dining Hall in Camp Broadbent is named after Cleveland businessman Ellsworth Hunt Augustus who served as tenth President of the Boy Scouts of America and contains dining facilities with a full kitchen, and a training center. The training center is commonly used for training events and activities year-round. Camp is under the leadership of General Manager Anthony Dworning, Program Director Dan Goerndt and Ranger Bear Roloff.

Camp Stigwandish was added to the Council in January 2017, when Greater Western Reserve Council was split and merged with Greater Cleveland and Great Trail Councils. Camp Stigwandish was the oldest operational camp in the Lake Erie Council. Northeast Ohio Council opened the Camp for summer programs in 1930, but it was opened to weekend camping in 1929. Camp Stigwandish will serve as the council's Cub Day camp and also help out with the Beaumont Scout Reservation summer camp program. Stigwandish is the primary home to scouters in Lake, Geauga and Ashtabula Counties. Camp Stigwandish was located in Madison Ohio and offered over 20 campsites, 6 cabins, 5 ranges (Rifle, Shotgun, Archery Range, Wrist Rocket Range and a separate Cub Scout Archery Range,) 3 Lakes including Bass Lake, Canoe Lake and Indian Lake. Indian Lake along with a small pond off the parking lot called Salamander Pond are the oldest body of water on the property. The property also had a low COPE course, trading post, dining hall, training center, nature center, Chapel and more. The camp sat on the banks of Mill Creek and was over 300 acres, 120 of them being able to be sold the rest are in a land conservancy or were sold to the Soil and Water conservations in the 1990s. While only 12 miles in between Beaumont Scout Reservation and Camp Stigwandish the terrain is extremely different. The camp was often referred to the hidden jewel of the council. In 2019, an assessment was conducted in which Camp Stigwandish was found to be unsustainable for Lake Erie Council to continue to operate. On June 18, 2020, Lake Erie Council transferred Camp Stigwandish to Ross Road LLC for a total of 1.6 million dollars. The Spirit of Camp Stigwandish will continue to live on.

Campsites for Camp Stigwandish included Dead Horse Ridge, Grand River, Solitude, Pop Corey, 3 Eagles Nest Campsites, Adventure, Johnny Appleseed, Pioneer Village, Woodcrafters, Dan Beard, Dan Boon, Kit Carson, Ted Mullans, Tecumseh, Paul Bunyan, Iroquois, a staff site to the east of the Baden Powell Lodge, and 3 adirondacks. Cabins included 4 small cabins along the Lake Road. The Camp Host Cabin, which included the camp office and health office, Rotary Cabin which was off the main road, Buckeye Lodge behind the dining hall. Facilities that were moved to Beaumont Scout Reservation included, the EP memorial shelter which was moved from Camp Chickagami, the Mouse House, which is still home to metal working, the New Archery Range, and the Moritz Family Program Center.

Firelands Scout Reservation was added to the council in January, 2017 after Heart of Ohio Council merged with the legacy Greater Cleveland Council to form the new Lake Erie Council. Firelands is home to 2 camps, Camp Avery Hand, and Camp Wyandot. Both camps will now be used all year around for scouters to use. The reservation is mainly used for NYLT, Scoutmaster Training, and Cub Scout activities.

Tinnerman Wilderness Canoe Base, more commonly known as Tinnerman Canoe Base, was a "high-adventure base" located on the banks of the French River, in Ontario. In the 18th and early 19th centuries, the French River area was a major trade route used to exchange furs trapped in the West with various goods made in the East and in Europe. Tinnerman is nicknamed the "Land of the Joli Voyageur". The land that the Tinnerman base is located on was owned by Albert H. Tinnerman, inventor of the speed nut. After Mr. Tinnerman's passing in 1961, his grandson Bill Buttriss of Cleveland Ohio tried to obtain a commercial license for the camp. The Ontario government said that any one area would support only so many camps and they felt the lower French had enough camps at that time. Though appealed, a license was not possible for the camp. It was at this time the family decided to donate the camp to the Cleveland Area Scout Council. Two weeks after the formal donation, Mr. Buttriss received a letter from the Ontario government stating that since one of the camps in the area had closed its doors (Rainbow Lodge on Bass Creek), the license would now be available.

From 1963 to 2011, the base was owned and operated by the Greater Cleveland Council. In 2011, citing a lack of attendance and other factors, the Greater Cleveland Council permanently closed Tinnerman Canoe Base and put it up for sale. Distraught Tinnerman alumni created a detailed proposal for a non-profit Tinnerman Foundation, to keep the camp operating as a canoe base for youthful explorers. On February 21, 2012, the Greater Cleveland Council announced that "the executive board of Greater Cleveland Council, Boy Scouts of America voted to unanimously accept a cash offer of $415,000 for the 10 acres (4.0 ha) property on the French River in Ontario, Canada that was the Tinnerman Wilderness Canoe Base. The purchase offer has no contingencies and is expected to be completed in early May 2012."

==== Order of the Arrow ====
- Cuyahoga Lodge #17 - Legacy Lodge as of 2017
- Wapashuwi Lodge #56 - Legacy Lodge as of 2017
- Portage Lodge #619 - Legacy Lodge as of 2017

Erielhonan Lodge was founded with the merger.

=== Heart of Ohio Council ===
Heart of Ohio Council (#450)
- Owner: Scouting America
- Headquarters: Ashland, Ohio
- Founded: 1994
- Defunct: 2017
- President: Daniel DeVille
- Commissioner: John 'JJ' Harbaugh, Jr
- Scout Executive: Brad Bodoh
- Website; NA

Heart of Ohio Council (#450) was created in 1994. It was composed of four districts. Geographically, the Heart of Ohio Council served the youth of Ashland, Crawford, Erie, Huron, Lorain, Marion, Morrow, Richland, and Wyandot Counties in North Central Ohio.

==== History ====
The Heart of Ohio Council was officially organized in 1994 with the merger of the Harding Area, the Johnny Appleseed Area and the Firelands Area Councils, and was one of the largest geographic councils within the state of Ohio. In 2017, the Heart of Ohio Council was dissolved and split, with the northern counties of Erie, Huron and Lorain joining the newly formed Lake Erie Council, and the remaining southern counties joining the Buckeye Council.

Mansfield Council #453 founded 1919	Sandusky City Council #458 founded 1921
Johnny Appleseed Council #453 renamed 1926	Firelands Area Council #458 renamed 1925	Harding Area Council #443 founded 1926
Heart of Ohio Council #450 merged January 1, 1994

==== Organization ====
- Johnny Appleseed Trail District
- The Firelands District
- Great Frontier District
- Harding Area District

==== Camps ====
The Heart of Ohio Council operated one reservation known as Firelands Scout Reservation, which is now run by the Lake Erie Council. It is located 5 miles west of Oberlin, in Wakeman, on 455 acres of land. The reservation holds two camps, Camp Avery Hand (the Cub Scout camp) and Camp Wyandot (the Scouts BSA camp). Each individual camp is named for former camps once a part of the original councils that merged to form the Heart of Ohio Council.

The reservation is about 70% wooded. There is a 23-acre lake with an island connected by a peninsula on Camp Wyandot. The camp has operated as a Scout camp since 1938. Cabin and tent camping are available.

==== Order of the Arrow ====
- Portage Lodge 619

portage619.org

=== Miami Valley Council ===
Miami Valley Council (#444)
- Owner: Scouting America
- Headquarters: Dayton, Ohio
- Country: United States
- Scout Executive: Jeff Schiavone
- Website www.miamivalleybsa.org

Headquartered in Dayton, the Miami Valley Council (#444) serves Darke, Preble, Miami, Shelby and Montgomery counties in Ohio.

=== Muskingum Valley Council ===
Muskingum Valley Council (#467)
- Owner: Scouting America
- Headquarters: Zanesville, Ohio
- Founded: 1956
- President: Ed Wolfel
- Commissioner: Frank O'Hare
- Scout Executive: Jared Smith
- Website mvcbsa.org

Muskingum Valley Council (#467) was created in 1956. It is composed of three districts.

==== History ====
Zanesville Council #467 founded 1919
Muskingum County Council #467 renamed 1923
Zane Trace Area Council #467 renamed 1929
Muskingum Valley Council #467 merged 1956

Coshocton County Council #442 founded 1922
Kno-Co-Ho-Tus Council #442 renamed 1928
Tomahawk Area Council #442 renamed 1947

==== Organization ====
- Arrowhead District includes Coshocton County, OH and Knox County, OH.
- River Trails District includes Guernsey County, OH, Noble County, OH, Washington County, OH, Pleasants County, WV, and the cities of New Concord, OH and Williamstown, WV.
- Zane Trace District includes Muskingum County, OH, Morgan County, OH, and Perry County, OH.

==== Camps ====
The Muskingum Valley Scout Reservation (MVSR) is the council's year-round camping facility. Located on over 500 acres (2.0 km^{2}) of reclaimed land near Conesville in Coshocton county, MVSR has offered Scouts a wide variety of options to expand their camping experience since its opening in 1968.

==== Order of the Arrow ====
- Netawatwees Lodge #424

=== Ohio River Valley Council ===
Ohio River Valley Council (#619)
- Owner: Scouting America
- Headquarters: Wheeling, West Virginia
- Founded: 1991
- President: Ryan Murray
- Commissioner: Rick Greenwood
- Scout Executive: Bob Drury
- Website orvc-bsa.org

Ohio River Valley Council (#619) serves Cub Scouting, Scouts BSA, and Venturing, in West Virginia and Ohio.

=== Simon Kenton Council ===
Simon Kenton Council (#441)
- Owner: Scouting America
- Headquarters: Columbus, Ohio
- Country: United States
- Founded: 1994
- Scout Executive: Jeff Moe
- Website skcscouts.org

Simon Kenton Council (#441) serves Scouts in central and southern Ohio and in northern Kentucky. The council headquarters is in Columbus, Ohio.

In 1917, the Marietta Council (#464) was formed, changing its name to the Washington County Council (#464) in 1922. Washington County Council changed names to Southeastern Ohio Council (#464) in 1923. In 1942, the Southeastern Ohio Council (#464) was divided, with part going to the Kootaga Area Council (#618) and part becoming the Chief Logan Council (#464). In 1919, the Newark Council (#451) was formed, changing its name to the Licking County Council (#451) in 1922. In 1915, the Portsmouth Council (#457) was formed, changing its name to the Scioto County Council (#457) in 1923. In 1931 Scioto County Council changed its name to the Scioto Area Council (#457). In 1921, the Chillicothe Council (#437) was formed, merging into the Columbus Council (#441) in 1929. In 1922, the Fairfield County Council (#445) was formed, merging into the Columbus Council (#441) in 1929. In 1923, the Lawrence County Council (#450) was formed, merging into the Scioto County Council (#457) in 1929. In 1919, the Pickaway County Council was formed, merging into the Columbus Council (#441) in 1929. In 1910, the Columbus Council was formed, changing its name to the Central Ohio Council (#441) in 1930. In 1922, the Licking County Council (#451) was formed, merging into the Central Ohio Council (#441) in 1987. In 1994, the Simon Kenton Council (#441) was formed from the merger of the Central Ohio Council (#441), Chief Logan Council (#464), and Scioto Area Council (#457).

=== Tecumseh Council ===
Tecumseh Council (#439)
- Owner: Scouting America
- Country: United States
- Founded: 1923
- President: Daniel Kirkpatrick
- Council Commissioner: Bob Hemmerly
- Scout Executive: Robert Lavoie
- Website tecumsehcouncilbsa.org

Tecumseh Council (#439) was founded in 1923. It is composed of five districts and serves more than 4,700 youth in five counties in Ohio.

==== History ====
Clark County Council #439 founded 1923
Tecumseh Council #439 renamed 1929

==== Organization ====
- Blue Jacket District serves Logan County, Ohio.
- Bull Skin Trail District serves Champaign County, Ohio.
- Chillicothe District serves Greene County, Ohio.
- Lagonda District serves Clark County, Ohio.
- Robert E. Hadley District serves Clinton County, Ohio.

==== Camps ====
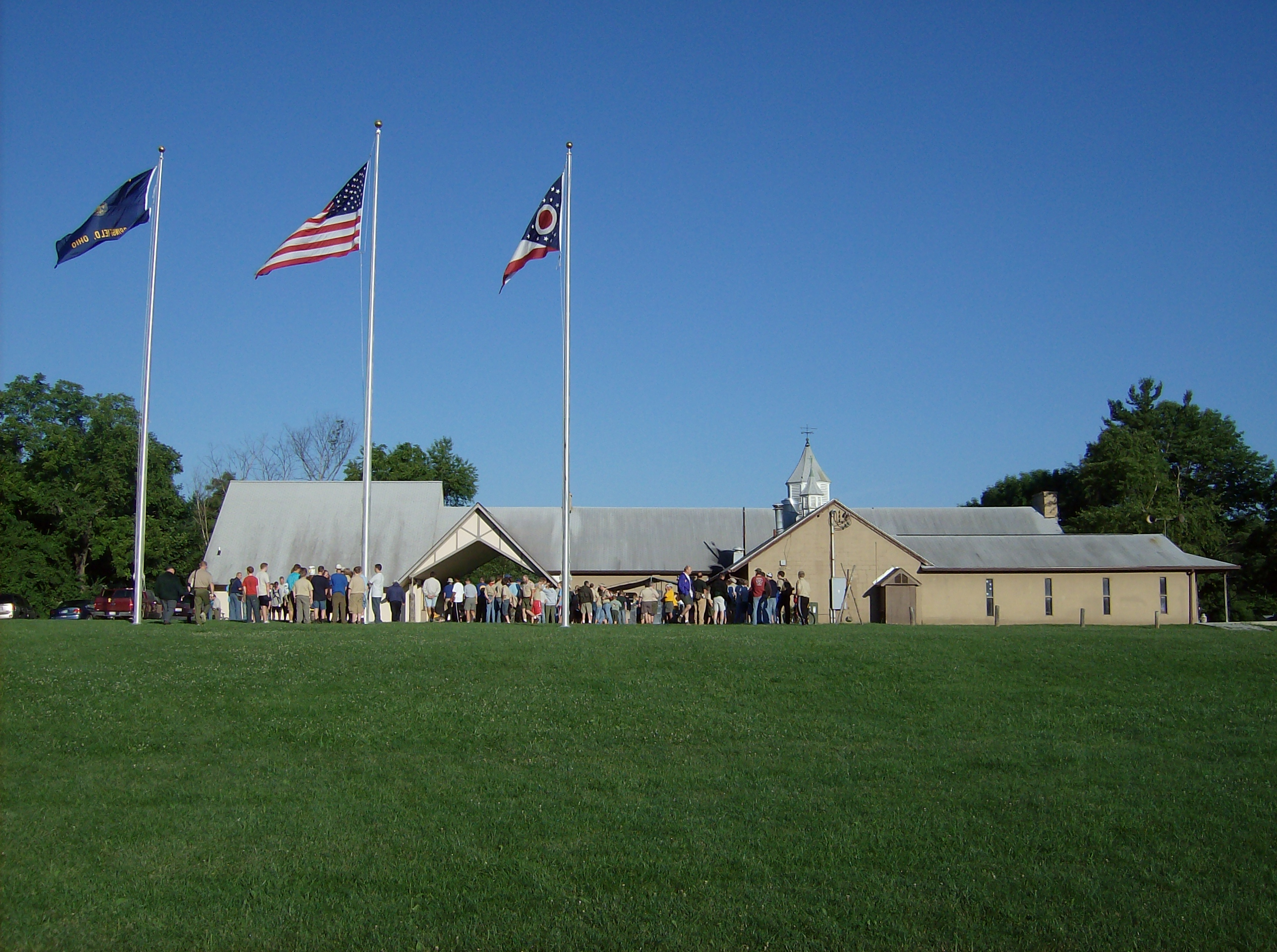
Camp Hugh Taylor Birch

Camp Hugh Taylor Birch was founded in 1932 at only 25 acres (0.10 km^{2}) acres, growing to 440 acres (1.8 km^{2}) today. Camp Birch features a dining hall, an Olympic size swimming pool, and a 10 acres (0.040 km^{2}) lake. Adjacent to Clifton Gorge, John Bryan State Park and Glen Helen Nature Preserve, Camp High Taylor Birch is a part of 2,000 acres (8.1 km^{2}) of continuous natural woodlands.

==== Order of the Arrow ====
- Tarhe Lodge

== Girl Scouts of the USA in Ohio ==
Girl Scouting in Ohio
- Map of Girl Scout Councils in Ohio

There are five Girl Scout councils serving Ohio.

=== Girl Scouts of Black Diamond Council ===
Serving girls in several eastern counties in Ohio, and headquartered in Charleston, West Virginia.

=== Girl Scouts of Kentucky's Wilderness Road Council ===
Serving girls in Lawrence County, Ohio, and headquartered in Lexington, Kentucky.

=== Girl Scouts of North East Ohio ===
Girl Scouts of North East Ohio
- Owner: GSUSA
- Headquarters: Macedonia, Ohio
- Country: United States
- Founded: 2007
- Chief Executive Officer: Jane Christyson
- Board Chair: Brenda Heidinger
- Website gsneo.org

Girl Scouts of North East Ohio (GSNEO) serves nearly 30,000 girls and has 14,000 adult volunteers.

GSNEO was formed in 2007 by the merger of five different councils: Erie Shores, Great Trail, Lake Erie, Lake to River, and Western Reserve. Its history dates back to 1912 when the first known girl scout troop in the area was started.

Service Centers:

- Macedonia, Ohio (headquarters and council offices)
- Lorain, Ohio
- Youngstown, Ohio
- North Canton, Ohio

The current council camps are:

- Camp Ledgewood, established in 1931 with 350 acres (140 ha) and a 2 acres (0.81 ha) lake in Peninsula, Ohio within the Cuyahoga Valley National Park boundaries.
- Camp Timberlane, a 324 acres (131 ha) camp in Wakeman, Ohio (within the Firelands Reserve) which was acquired in 1956.
- Camp Sugarbush, with nearly 200 acres (81 ha) in Kinsman, Ohio.

=== Girl Scouts of Ohio's Heartland Council ===
Girl Scouts of Ohio's Heartland Council
- Owner: GSUSA
- Headquarters: Columbus, Ohio
- Country: United States
- Founded: 2009
- Chief Executive Officer: Tammy Wharton
- Board Chair: Laura L. Warren
- Website gsoh.org

Girl Scouts of Ohio's Heartland Council serves over 29,000 girls in 33 counties in central, north-central, south-central, and southeastern Ohio.

This was formed by a merger of Girl Scouts - Seal of Ohio Council, Girl Scouts - Heart of Ohio, and Heritage Trails Girl Scout Council on January 1, 2009.

Council camps are Beckoning Trails in the Hocking hills with 108 acres (44 ha), Crooked Lane near Mt. Gilead, Ohio with 226 acres (91 ha), 240 acres (97 ha) Ken-Jockety along the Big Darby Creek in Franklin County, and Molly Lauman near Lucasville, Ohio with 170 acres (69 ha). The Zanesville Service Center in Muskingum County also has 8 acres (3.2 ha) which can be used for camping. Camp Cornish in Knox County had been a Girl Scout camp but was sold and acquired by a local community foundation for use by non-profit groups; the local council has 35 guaranteed days a year at it.

=== Girl Scouts of Western Ohio ===
Girl Scouts of Western Ohio
- Owner: GSUSA
- Headquarters: Cincinnati, Ohio
- Country: United States
- Chief Executive Officer: Roni Luckenbill
- Chief Operating Officer: Susan Osborn
- Board Chair: Ellen Iobst
- Website gswo.org

Girl Scouts of Western Ohio serves about 42,000 girls in Western Ohio and southeast Indiana.

This was formed by a merger of Girl Scouts of Appleseed Ridge, Girl Scouts of Buckeye Trails Council, Girl Scout Great Rivers Council, and Girl Scouts of Maumee Valley Council.

Service Centers:

- Dayton, Ohio
- Lima, Ohio
- Toledo, Ohio

Camps

The camps include Butterworth (1930), Libbey (1935), Rolling Hills (1958), Stonybrook (1953), Whip-Poor-Will (1936), and Woodhaven (1946). As well as these, there are nine closed camps that fall in the current GSWO jurisdiction. These camps are; Segur (1920-?), Wildwood (1921-1936), Mac O' Chee (1949-1996), Greene (1955-?), Unaliyi (1958-1984), Ross Trails (1959-1989), Myeerah (1959-?), Timber Hill (1976-2006), and Brookside (?-?). These camps were closed for a number of reasons; Segur was too small for the council standards, Ross Trails was near a nuclear plant, Wildwood had a large fire and burned down, and so on.

Camp Butterworth was established in 1930 and originally named Camp Kathrine Butterworth. This name comes from the wife of the owner of the property, William Butterworth. The name of the camp was changed to William Butterworth sometime after 1938, the last newspaper referring to the camp with its original name being published that year. The land was originally loaned to the Girl Scouts for 20 years, though it is not known how the camp remained in their possession after that window expired. Currently the camp is simply named Butterworth, and holds day camps during the summer & open reservations during the off-season.

Camp Libbey was established in 1936 and named after Edward Drummond Libbey. He left $25,000 to the Girl Scouts for a campsite in 1925) with nearly 350 acres (140 ha) on the banks of the Maumee River near Defiance, Ohio. The oldest building currently standing on camp, Linden House, was built in 1939, and the craft house was finished in 1950. Land was purchased for an expansion in 1978, and the camp was fully renovated for year-round use in 1980. The Kiwanis Club has been more than generous to the camp, building the Pill Box (The first aid building) in 1952, and donating new unit kitchens in 1960. Currently, during the first half of the summer the camp is used for resident camp, and during the second half is used for Troop Adventure Camp (TAC).

Camp Stonybrook was established in 1953, and has less readily available information on its history. In 2017 a storm hit the camp and rendered it unusable for Troop Adventure Camp (TAC) that summer. It was held at Camp Whip-Poor-Will instead. After this, the day camp West of the creek ceased use, and the low-ropes course was moved up the hill along the swinging bridge trails. Whether from the storm or another reason, the second building West of the creek, the "Apple Barn", was also rendered unusable. Between 2021 and 2022, the tennis courts were demolished to build the Program Pavilion. Around this time the Gaga pit was moved near the Ittman and Pinetree units, and the Council ring was moved down the hill across from the Maple Hollow unit. Currently, the camp is used for TAC all summer, and has open reservations during the off-season.

== Scouting museums in Ohio ==
- W.C. Moorehead Museum
- Manatoc Scout Museum - Great Trail Council in Peninsula, Ohio
- Miakonda Scouting Museum - Erie Shores Council in Toledo, Ohio
- Nathan L. Dauby Scouting Museum - Lake Erie Council in Cleveland, Ohio
- The Mill at Camp Crowell/Hilaka contains many Girl Scout artifacts.

== International Scouting units in Ohio ==
- Külföldi Magyar Cserkészszövetség Hungarian Scouting maintains four troops in Cleveland.
- The Federation of North-American Explorers Catholic Explorers movement has a Group (Holy Trinity FNE) in Cincinnati.

== See also ==
- Scouting
