= South Georgia Council =

Council of the Boy Scouts of America

- Owner: Boy Scouts of America
- Headquarters: Valdosta, Georgia
- Country: United States
- Founded: 2012
- Website https://www.sgcbsa.org/

South Georgia Council is a council of the Boy Scouts of America located in southern Georgia. The council headquarters is located in Valdosta, Georgia. The council serves Scouts in Atkinson, Baker, Ben Hill, Berrien, Calhoun, Brooks, Clay, Coffee, Cook, Clinch, Crisp, Dooly, Dougherty, Early, Echols, Irwin, Jeff Davis, Lanier, Lowndes, Lee, Miller, Mitchell, Schley, Sumter, Terrell, Tift, Turner, Wilcox and Worth counties.

== Organization ==
- Alapaha District
- Eight Rivers District
- Chehaw District

== History ==
Chehaw Council was founded in 1939, it was renamed Southwest Georgia Council in 1984, it was changed back to Chehaw Council in 2005. The name became the South Georgia Council when Chehaw Council and Alapaha Area Council merged on November 1, 2012.

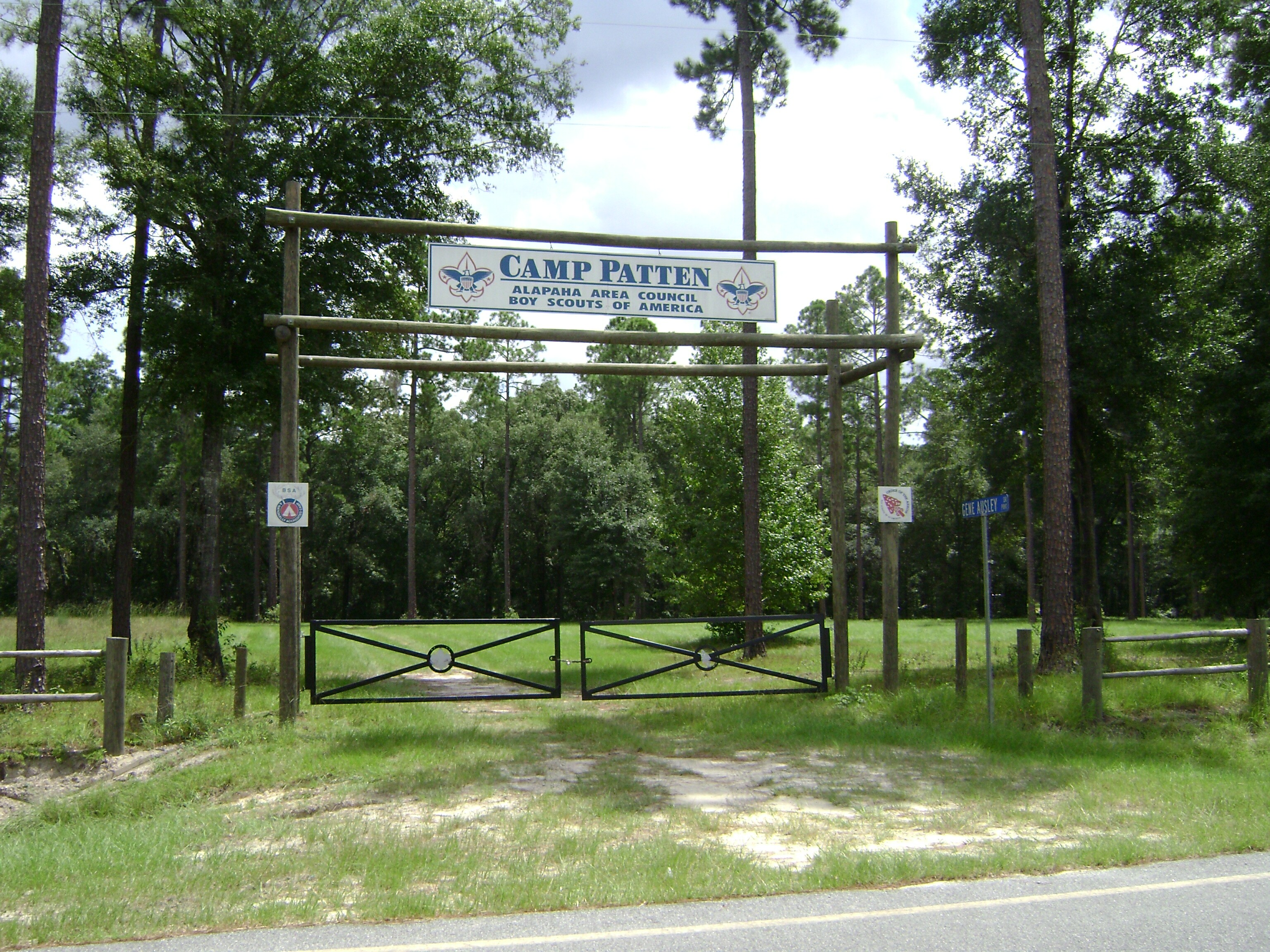
Camp Patten

== Camps ==
Chase S. Osborn Scout Reservation, also known as Camp Osborn, and Camp Patten serve the Scouts of the South Georgia Council. Camp Osborn is located near Sylvester, Georgia. and Camp Patten is located in Lakeland, Georgia.

== Order of the Arrow ==
Withlacoochee Lodge
- Website http://www.withlacoocheelodge.org

Withlacoochee Lodge serves the South Georgia Council.

== See also ==
- Scouting in Georgia (U.S. state)
