= Joseph Frazier Wall =

American historian (1920–1995)

- Born: July 10, 1920; Des Moines, Iowa, U.S.
- Died: October 9, 1995 (aged 75)
- Education: Grinnell College; Harvard University (MA); Columbia University (PhD)
- Occupation: Historian
- Spouse: Beatrice Mills Wall
- Children: 3
- Awards: Bancroft Prize (1971)

Joseph Frazier Wall (July 10, 1920 in Des Moines, Iowa – October 9, 1995) was an American historian and professor of history at Grinnell College.

He was born in Des Moines, and graduated from Grinnell College in 1941. He gained an MA from Harvard University and a PhD from Columbia University. He joined Grinnell in 1947. He took a leave of absence in the late 1980s to be chairman of the History Department at the State University of New York in Albany. He retired as professor emeritus in 1990.

His biography of Andrew Carnegie won the Bancroft Prize in 1971, and was recommended by Charlie Munger in his book Poor Charlie's Almanack. His biography on the Du Pont family was nominated for the Pulitzer Prize.

He married Beatrice Mills Wall (1918–2012); they had three children.

== Books ==
- Henry Watterson: Reconstructed Rebel, 1956, Oxford University Press
- Andrew Carnegie, 1970, Oxford University Press
- Skibo, 1984, Oxford University Press
- The Andrew Carnegie Reader, 1992, University of Pittsburgh Press
- Alfred I. Du Pont; The Man and His Family, 1990, Oxford University Press
