= Student accommodation =

Building where students reside

Student accommodation is a building or buildings used to house students, particularly in higher education. These are known by different names around the world, such as halls of residence, residence halls, accommodation blocks (particularly within residential colleges) or student hostels. Student accommodation may be managed by educational institutions, religious bodies or other charities, student associations, private companies, or agencies of local or national governments.

== History ==
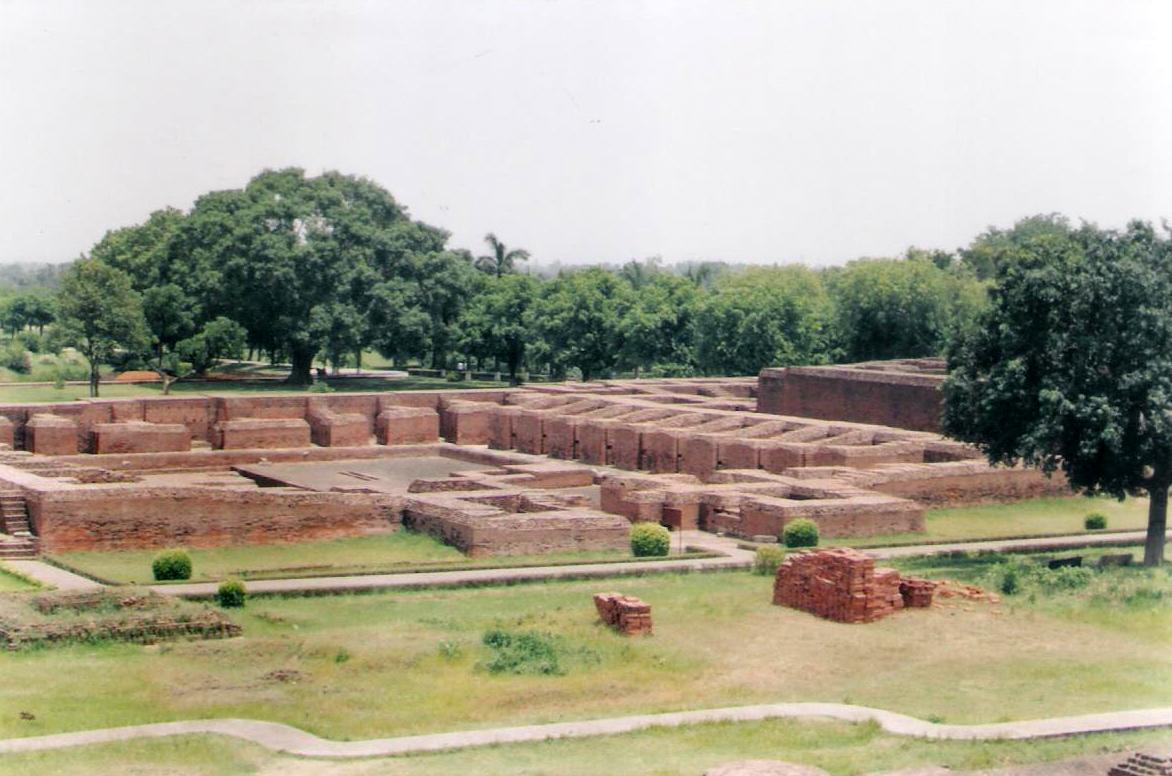
Cells in a vihara at Nalanda

Student accommodation is thought to date back to the 5th century Nalanda mahavihara, sometimes referred to as "the world's first residential university". (Note: Scholars have challenged the characterisation of Nalanda as a "university", but that it was a residential institution of higher learning appears to be undisputed) Student accommodation appeared in the Islamic world as part of the 10th century masjid-khan (mosque-inn), the forerunner of the madrasa. In China, student accommodation was introduced during the Song dynasty (10th to 13th centuries), with students having combined sleeping and study rooms. Students were permitted to stay overnight at the Taixue from the 1050s, on the initiative of lecturers Hu Yuan and Sun Fu, possibly to avoid students being distracted by the entertainments available in Kaifeng. When a new campus for the institution was built by Li Jie in 1102, it contained 100 halls of residence housing 30 students each.

The first college at a European university was the Collège des Dix-Huit, established at the University of Paris in the late 12th century. However, the early European colleges were only for postgraduate students. Undergraduates were housed from the 12th century onwards in university-approved accommodation known as halls in Oxford, hostels in Cambridge and pedagogies in Paris. These were run by a principal but were not endowed or incorporated. By the mid 15th century there were around 50 halls at Oxford, but following the admission of undergraduates to colleges and the rise of tutorial teaching at the expense of lectures, half of these had closed by the start of the 16th century and this declined further to seven or eight by the mid 16th century.

Colleges flourished most strongly in England and France, with comparatively few medieval colleges in Spain and Italy. In Germany and other lands of the Holy Roman Empire, colleges developed as accommodation for masters rather than students and the non-collegiate halls remained until after the Reformation. Even in Paris, Oxford and Cambridge, where the colleges were strongest, they only accommodated 10 to 20 per cent of students.

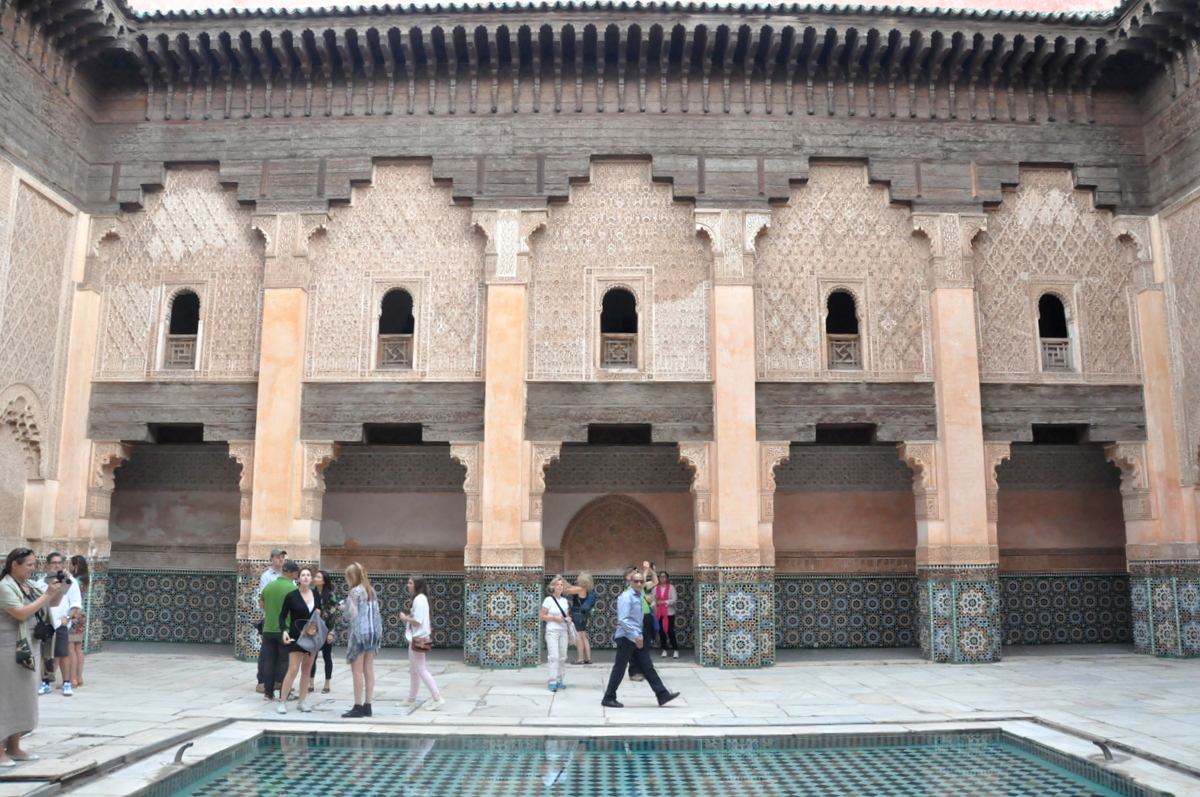
Student rooms overlooking the central patio at Madrasa Ben Youssef

In Islamic lands, madrasas offered student accommodation within the main building. Examples include the 13th century Mustansiriyya Madrasa in Baghdad, where students were housed in individual cells, and the 14th century Al-Attarine Madrasa in Fez, Morocco, which had over 30 rooms housing around 60 students. The Madrasa Ben Youssef, built in the 16th century in Marrakesh, Morocco, had 134 student rooms arranged around 13 small courtyards to accommodate its student population. These had a reading area near the window, in the brightest part of the room, and a wooden alcove enclosing a sleeping area in the darker interior.

In the early modern period, residence in college became the norm in England and France, and was even made a legal requirement at French universities in the mid 16th century. Colleges were also important in Spain, although a majority of students there rented privately until the mid 17th century. Jesuit-run colleges drove a growth in residence in Spain in the 17th and 18th centuries. However, in Germany, Poland, Austria, the Netherlands and Bohemia, the halls fell away after the Reformation in both Catholic and Protestant regions. With the exception of the Jesuit colleges, there was a tendency for colleges to cater increasingly for wealthier students, which drove an increase in the number of colleges in Italy in the 16th and 17th century.

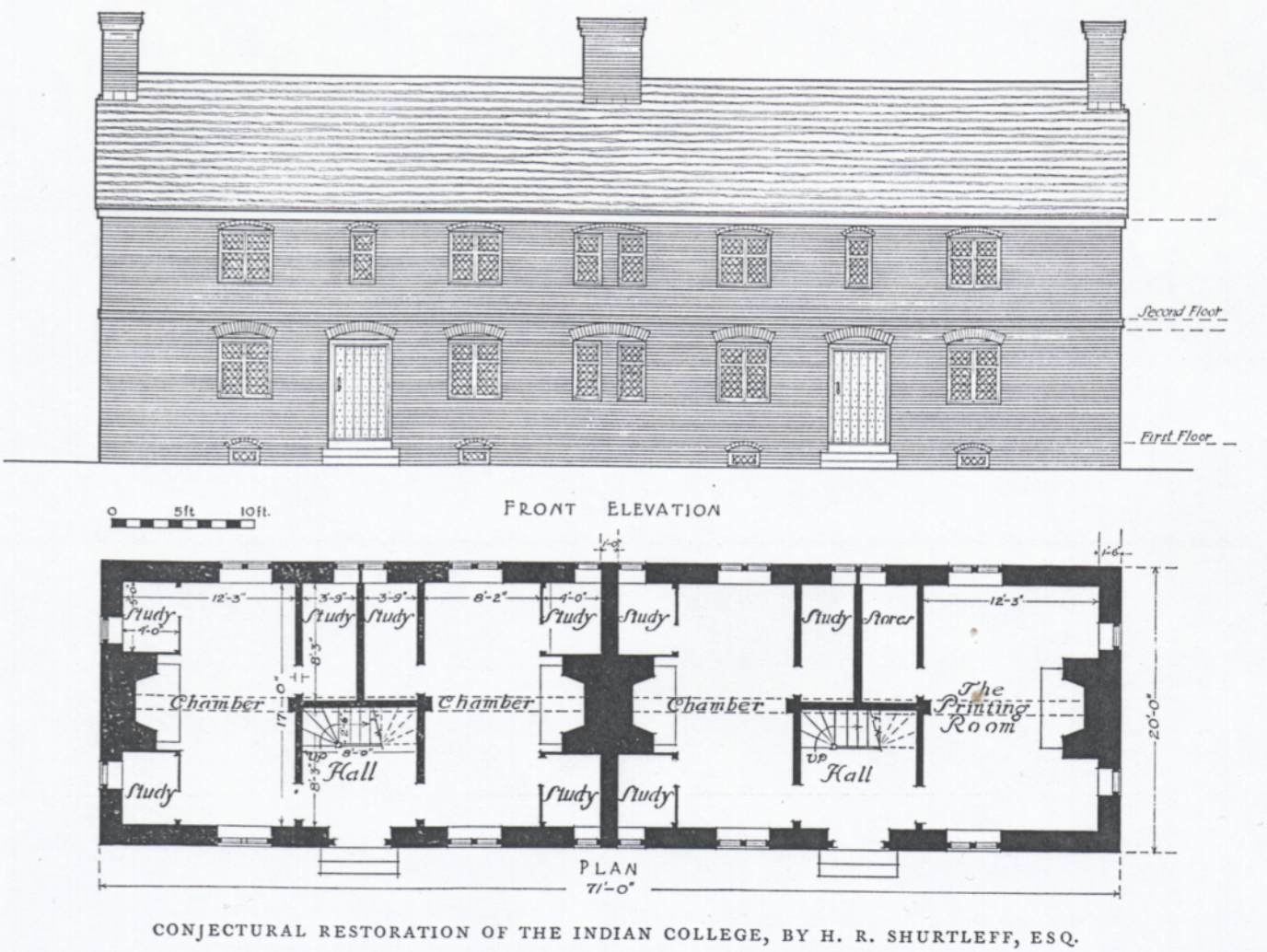
Conjectural reconstruction of the Harvard Indian College.

In the US colonial colleges, accommodation was often provided within the main college building in the 17th and 18th centuries. The first residential building was the Harvard Indian College in 1650. The early halls had a (normally shared) bedroom with a small study or closet off it for each student. These small rooms off a bedroom had become fashionable in Tudor England and had remained popular in the US. These could be rather small, with The Harvard Book of 1875 referring to the ones in Massachusetts Hall as "(so called) studies, or closets".

The French Revolution and the subsequent Napoleonic Wars saw the suppression of colleges in France and Spain, although some survived in Italy. In the US, Thomas Jefferson's "academical village" at the University of Virginia in the 1820s attempted to break away from the model of a large hall for student accommodation, with student rooms being directly off a classical arcade. However, the cost of building this made the university the most expensive in America, resulting in only the sons of the wealthiest families in the American South being able to attend.

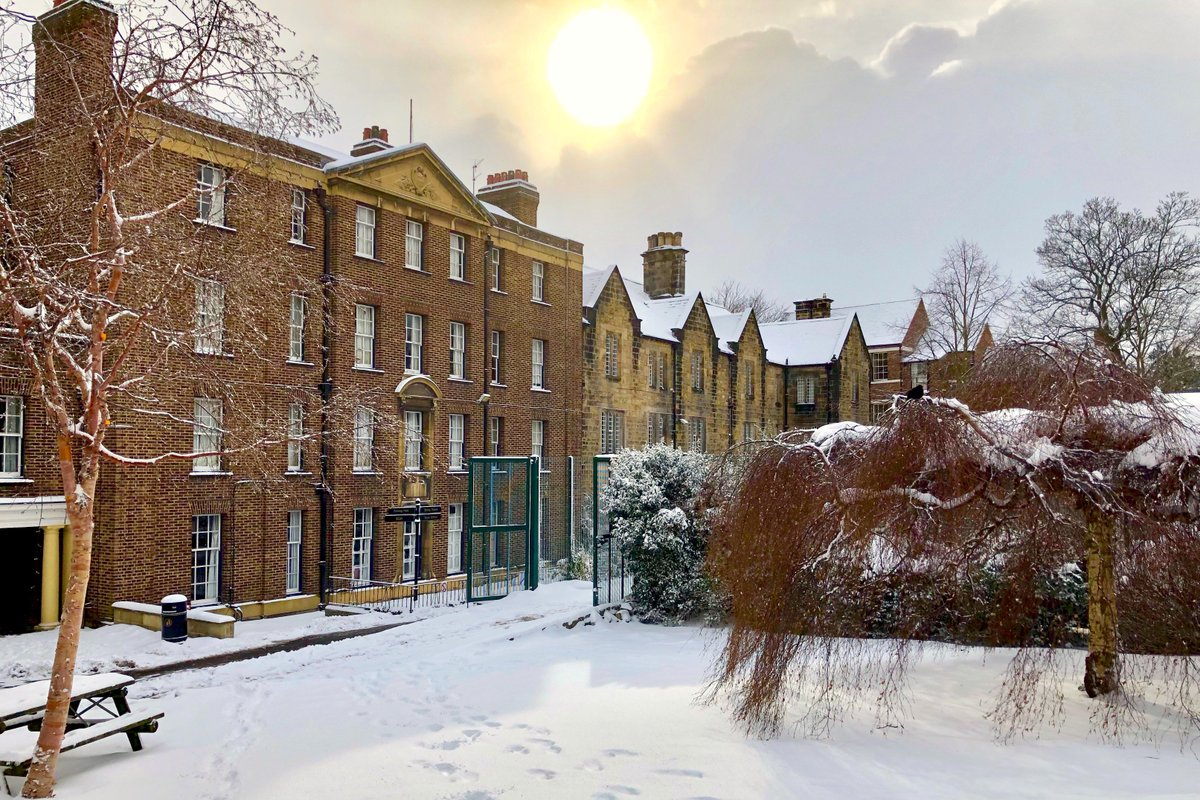
Hatfield College, Durham (originally Bishop Hatfield's Hall) – "Other than the foundation of the University itself ... arguably the single most successful and influential undertaking at Durham throughout the nineteenth century"

In England, the expense of the colleges of Oxford and Cambridge similarly acted as a barrier to entry to those universities. This was initially replicated at Durham University, established in 1832, but a much more economical residential system was initiated there at Bishop Hatfield's Hall in 1846, with rooms let furnished and with shared servants, all meals provided in hall, and prices for both rooms and meals set in advance. It also pioneered the use of single-room study bedrooms rather than the "set" (suite) of rooms with a separate study and bedroom found in the older colleges. The study bedroom was a recent innovation at that time, with the term first recorded in 1842. These innovations inspired the foundation of private halls (later permanent private halls) at Oxford and private hostels at Cambridge in the later 19th century and were taken up by Keble College, Oxford and Selwyn College, Cambridge, subsequently becoming the standard model for residential accommodation at universities around the world.

The second half of the 19th century saw the development of fraternity and sorority housing in the US. The first residential chapter house was established in 1864 by the Kappa Alpha Society at Williams College. At many US universities, fraternities provided the only organised student accommodation. (Note: The first fraternity chapter house was a 20 by 14 feet (6.1 m × 4.3 m) cabin built in 1846 by Chi Psi in Michigan, but this was a meeting lodge rather than a residential house)

Student accommodation was established at the Victorian redbrick universities in England in the late 19th and early 20th centuries for a number of reasons, including philanthropy, provision for female undergraduates, attracting students from outside of the local region, and because it was seen as an essential part of university life. It was not until after the first world war that university-funded halls of residence brought residential life back to continental Europe. In the UK, the University Grants Committee also identified building halls of residence as a priority for growing the provincial universities, while the inter-war period in the US saw the revitalisation of residential life with the construction of the house system at Harvard and the residential colleges at Yale.

== Types ==
=== Fraternity and sorority housing ===
Only found in North America, these are houses owned by student social societies known as fraternities and sororities. They are a major component of student accommodation in the US, but are also linked with reputational risk to universities and have been criticised for attracting alumni donations that might otherwise have gone to institutional projects.

=== Halls ===
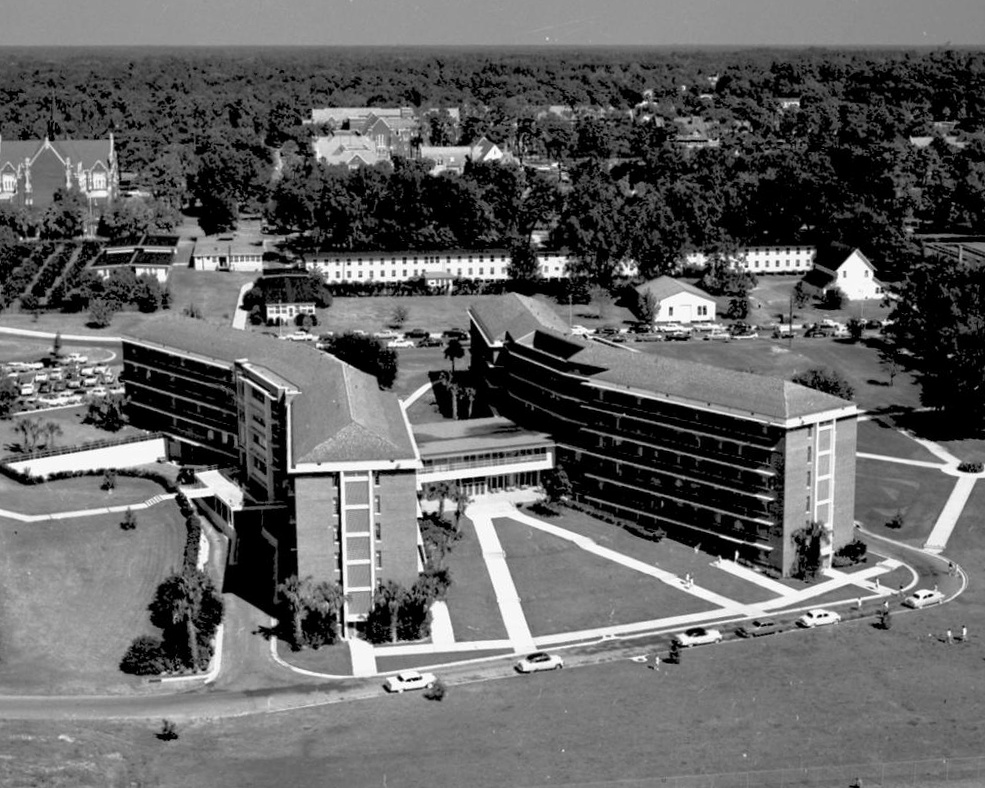
Broward Hall at the University of Florida in the 1960s

Known in different countries as halls, halls of residence, residences, residence halls, dormitories or hostels, this is the basic type that describes most student accommodation. Halls are distinguished from residential colleges by students being residents for the period they live in a hall rather than members throughout their time at university, whether in residence or not. Residential colleges may have multiple residential buildings, which may be referred to as accommodation blocks or halls of residence.

Accommodation in halls is often in traditional single or multiple occupancy study-bedrooms, which may be catered or self-catered (with a shared kitchen) and have either a shared bathroom or an en suite bathroom. Studio apartments are uncommon in university-owned halls and are mainly found in private halls.

=== Residential colleges ===
A residential college is a division of a university that places academic activity in a community setting of students and faculty, usually at a residence and with shared meals, the college having a degree of autonomy and a federated relationship with the overall university. The term residential college is also used to describe a variety of other patterns, ranging from a hall of residence with some academic programming, to continuing education programs for adults lasting a few days. In some parts of the world it simply refers to any organized on-campus housing, an example being University of Malaya.

=== Skyscraper dormitories ===
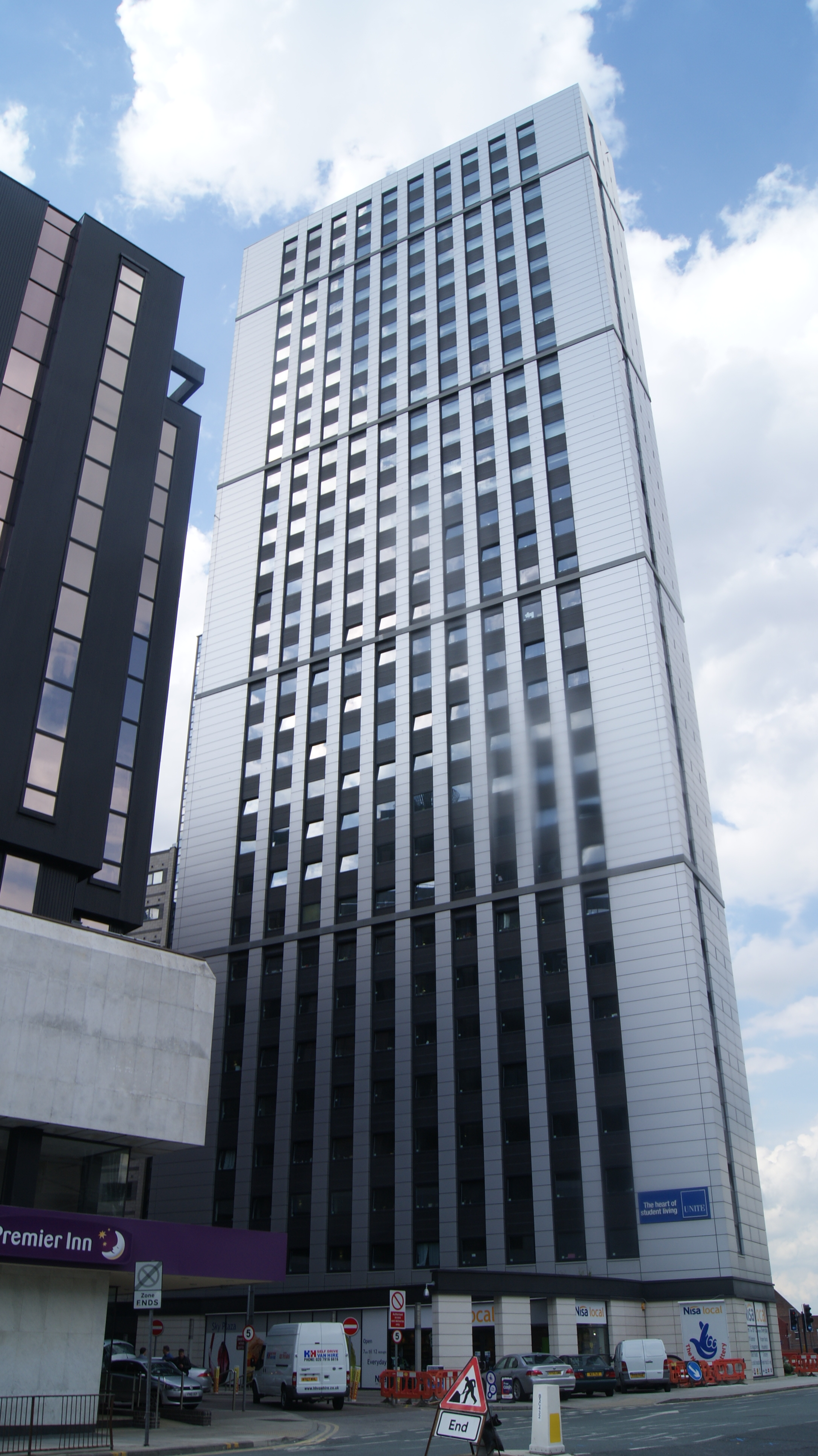
The Sky Plaza in Leeds, England, one of the world's tallest student accommodation blocks

Skyscraper dormitories, termed dormitowers, have included the 93-metre (305 ft) Fenwick Tower at Dalhousie University in Halifax, Canada, built in 1971, the 103-metre (338 ft) Sky Plaza in Leeds, UK, built in 2009, and the 112-metre (367 ft) Chapter Spitalfields in London, built in 2010, all of which held the title of the world's tallest purely student accommodation building when built. Some taller buildings include student accommodation among other uses, including the 132-metre (433 ft) Het Strijkijzer in The Hague, Netherlands, the 143-metre (469 ft) Roosevelt Tower at Roosevelt University in Chicago, and the 144-metre (472 ft) Capri at Marymount Manhattan College in New York. The 33 Beekman Street tower at Pace University in New York, completed in 2015, was also claimed to be the world's tallest student residence, at 104 metres (340 ft). Altus House in Leeds, UK, built in 2021, was described as the tallest student accommodation building in northern Europe at 116 metres (381 ft). The 50-storey, 148-metre (485 ft) 99 Washington Street tower in Manhattan, New York, originally built as a 492-room hotel, was re-opened in 2025 as the world's tallest student accommodation tower, housing 650 students. A 48-storey, 156 metres (512 ft) tall building housing 1,068 students is planned for 30 Marsh Wall in London's Canary Wharf district, and is expected to be the tallest student accommodation building in the world when completed (planned for 2028 as of 2025).

The proposed Munger Hall dormitory at the University of California, Santa Barbara would have been the largest university dormitory in the world with 4,500 students over 12 floors. The building, nicknamed "Dormzilla", was cancelled in 2023 after controversy over the design, including that 94% of the rooms would be windowless and that there were only two exits.

=== Student villages ===
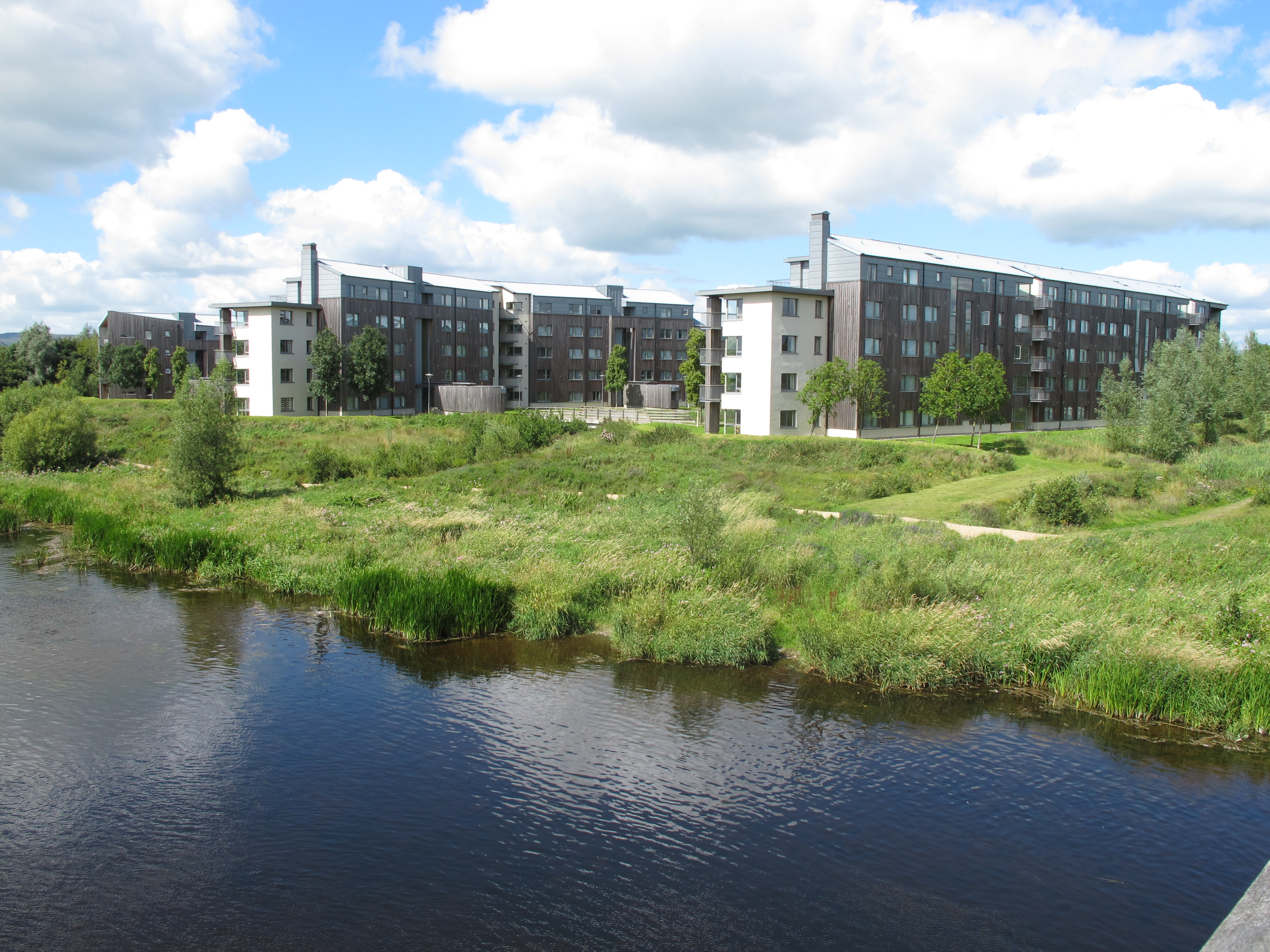
Thomond Student Village at the University of Limerick

A student village refers to an area of student accommodation, normally consisting of multiple halls, which may be at a distance from the campus. Notable student villages include Turku Student Village in Finland, Cheney Student Village in the UK and Studentendorf Schlachtensee in Germany.

=== Townhouses ===
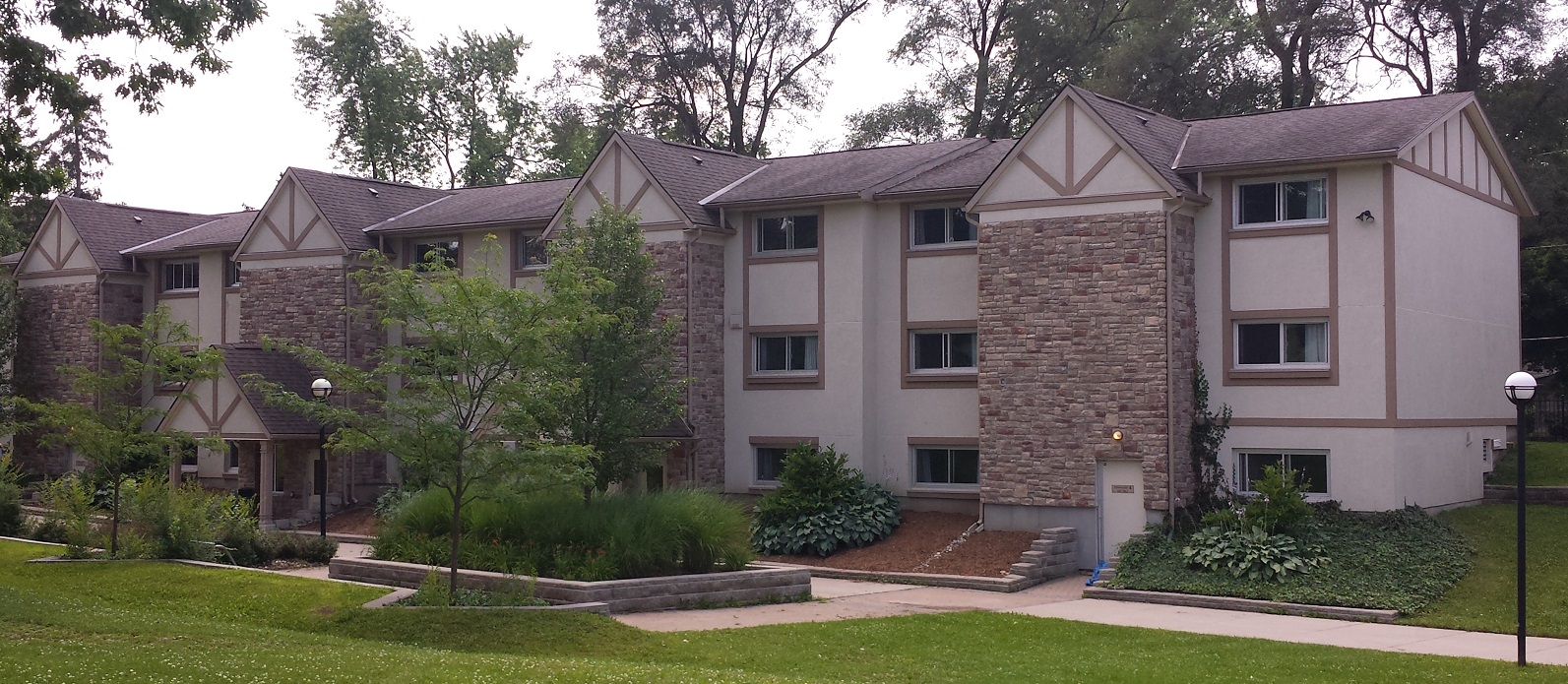
Townhouses at King's University College, University of Western Ontario

University-built townhouses, normally either on campus or in student villages, typically have the ground floor given over to shared facilities, such as a lounge and kitchen, with the upper two or three floors housing eight to twelve students.

== By country ==
=== France ===
In France, student accommodation is provided by the state in "university residences" managed by the centres régional des œuvres universitaires et scolaires (regional centres for university and school works) for holders of government scholarships. For other students, accommodation is provided through private "student residences" or through private rental. In Paris, the Cité Internationale Universitaire de Paris provides accommodation for around 6,000 postgraduate students from around the world.

=== Germany ===
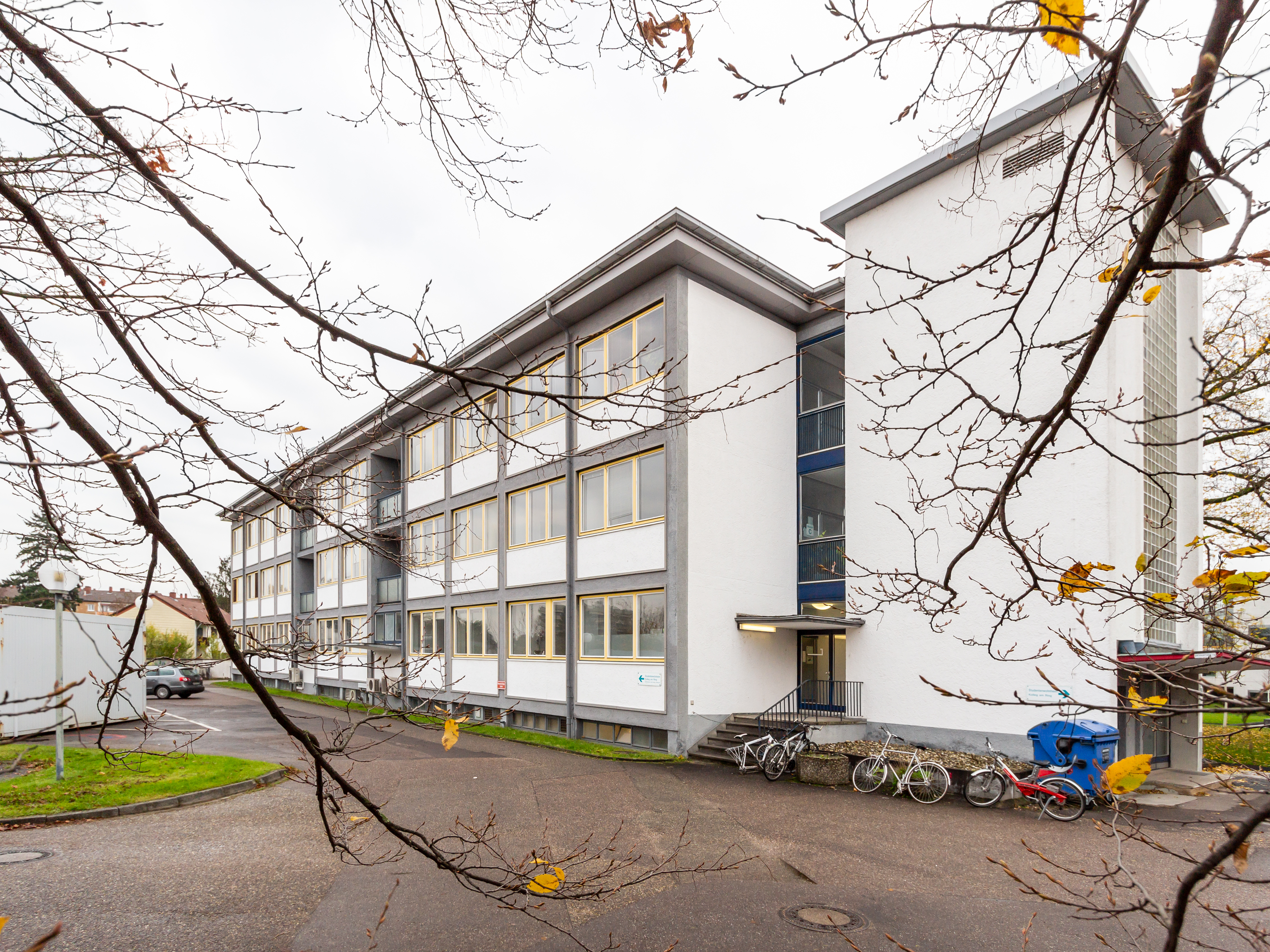
Studentenwohnheim in Karlsruhe

In Germany, student accommodation is called Studentenwohnheim (plural: Studentenwohnheime). Many of these are run by Studentenwerke (student services organisations), which have around 195,000 spaces across the country in over 1,700 halls, or by Studierendenwerke (students' unions). Some Studentenwohnheime are run by social organisations or by Catholic or Protestant churches; many of these take students of any denomination or religion. These facilities are sometimes single-sex. At either church or social organisation residences students may be required to participate in service activities. Private halls normally cost more than church or social organisation halls, or students' union halls.

=== India ===
In India, student accommodation is called "student hostels". Many colleges and universities have hostels on-campus, but this is frequently insufficient for the number of students enrolled. Most students prefer to stay off-campus in private "paying guest" (PG) accommodation and private hostels as these usually have better amenities and services. For example, in 2015 an estimated 180,000 students enrolled with Delhi University, there are only about 9,000 beds available in its hostels for both undergraduate and postgraduate students. The university admits an average of 54,000 students every year. This leaves a majority of students having to find accommodation off-campus. This has led to a lot of student hostel or student PG chains being established near Delhi University.

=== Turkey ===
Student accommodation in Turkey is called as öğrenci yurdu. The majority of student accommodation in Turkey are owned and managed by the Credits and Dormitories General Directorate (Kredi ve Yurtlar Genel Müdürlüğü) under the Ministry of Youth and Sports. The entity was formerly called as the Credits and Dormitories Institution (Kredi ve Yurtlar Kurumu, KYK or YURTKUR). The accommodation is single-sex, usually housing 4-6 students in a single room. There also are university-owned and private for-profit/non-profit accommodation, as well as lodgings.

Higher-education in pre-Republican Turkey usually revolved around medreses, which were predominantly boarding schools. Newer, Western-style higher-education institutions (such as the Darülfünun) also followed this tradition. The lodging cells within these institutions formed the basis of accommodation after the abolition of medreses. However, government-controlled accommodations soon became overcrowded; causing other public and private bodies to set up accommodations. All of the government-controlled accommodations were transferred to the Ministry of National Education in 1949. The ministry managed the dormitories with minimal funding. The dormitories were handed over to the Dormitories Institution in 1961, by a law promulgated in the Constituent Assembly of Turkey on 16 August 1961.

=== United Kingdom ===
==== Historical development ====
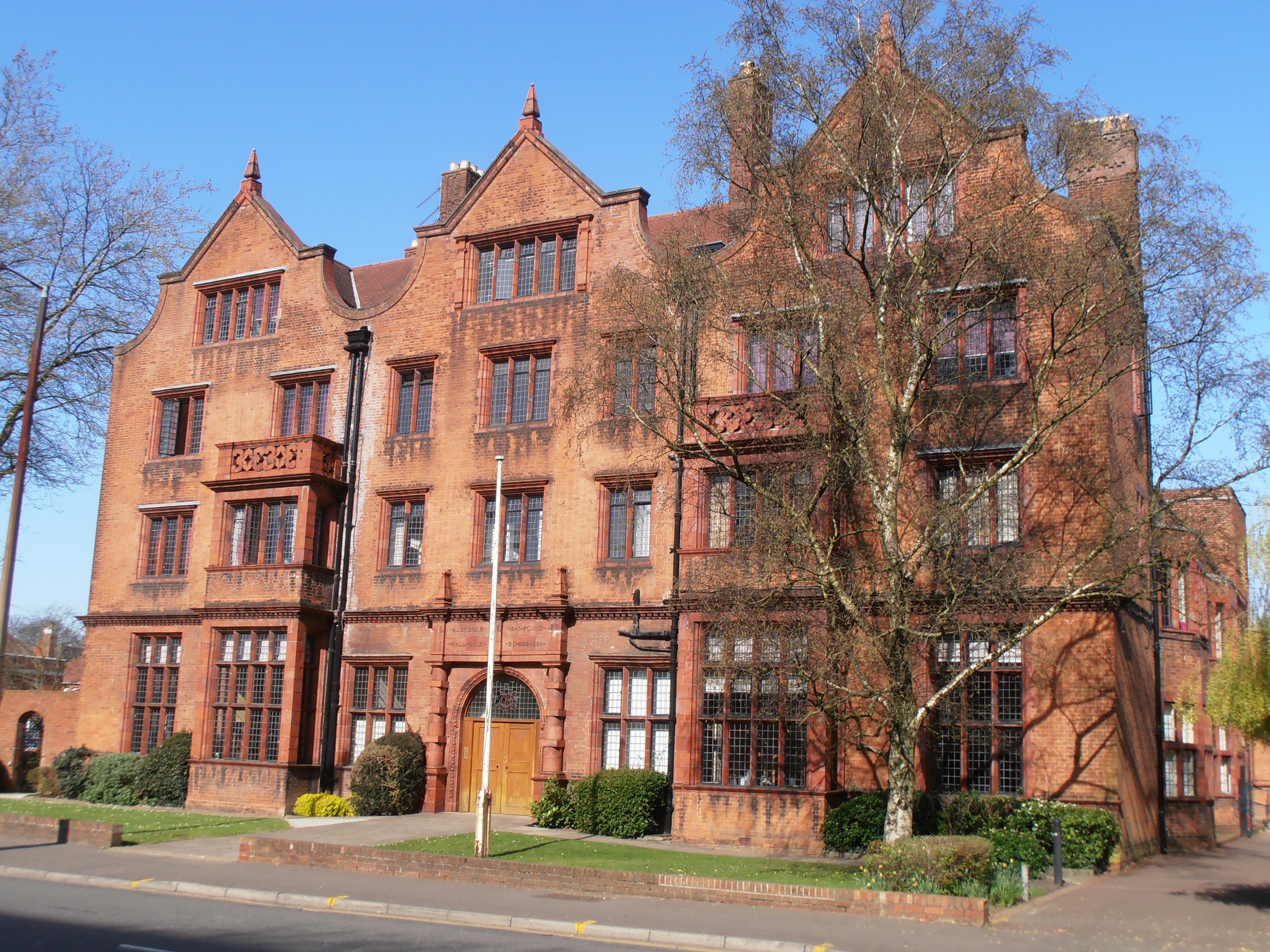
Aberdare Hall at Cardiff University, built in 1895, one of the few remaining single-sex halls of residence in the UK

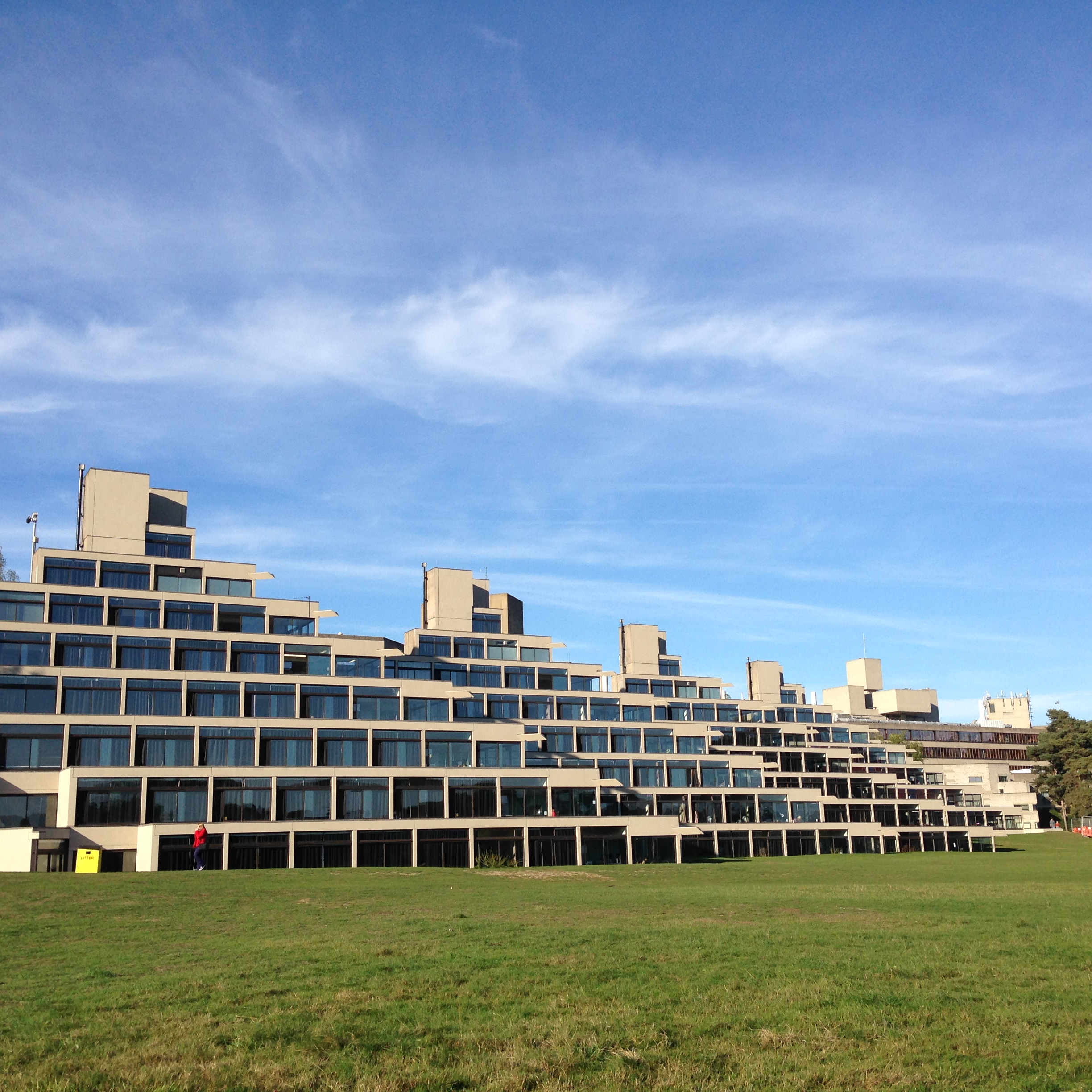
Denys Lasdun's 'ziggurats' (1968), University of East Anglia

Until the mid 19th century, students at residential universities in England lived in colleges, where they rented a set of unfurnished rooms, paid their own servants, and bought their own meals. The first change from this came with the foundation of Bishop Hatfield's Hall (now Hatfield College) by David Melville at Durham University in 1846. This introduced three key concepts: rooms would be let furnished, all meals would be taken communally, and all expenses would be reasonable and fixed in advance, which combined to make the cost of accommodation in the hall much lower than in colleges. Melville also introduced single room study-bedrooms and, in 1849, opened the first purpose-built hall of residence in the country at Hatfield. The Oxford University Commission of 1852 found that "The success that has attended Mr. Melville's labours in Hatfield Hall at Durham is regarded as a conclusive argument for imitating that institution in Oxford"; this report led to a requirement in the Oxford University Act 1854 that Oxford allow the establishment of private halls, although these halls were never very successful.

The 19th century London colleges were originally non-residential. King's College London established a hall for theological students in a house adjacent to the college in 1847, although this only lasted until 1858. University Hall was opened in 1849 by a group of mainly Unitarian Dissenters for students at University College London. This also struggled until taken over by Manchester New College in 1881, after which it flourished for a period but was subsequently closed when that college moved to Oxford in 1890. Bedford College, London, at the time the only women's college in Britain, opened a residence in 1860. College Hall, London was established in 1882 for women students at University College London (which had become mixed a few years earlier) and the London School of Medicine for Women. Like the other London halls (with the exception of the Bedford College residence) this was initially private, but was taken over by the University of London in 1910.

The provincial university colleges that became the redbrick universities were established as non-residential institutions in the 19th century, but later became the universities most closely associated with the development of halls of residence (as distinct from the residential colleges of the older universities). William Whyte identifies four main drivers for the building of halls of residence in the late 19th and early 20th centuries. These were: firstly, for philanthropic reasons (often linked to religion), such as the Anglican St Anselm Hall (1872/1907) and the Quaker Dalton Hall (1881), both at Owens College (now the University of Manchester); secondly, to provide safe accommodation for female undergraduates, who it was felt at that time could not live in lodgings; thirdly, to attract students from more distant parts of the country, particularly for university colleges in smaller urban areas such as Reading, Exeter and Leicester; and fourthly, because residential provision was becoming seen as an essential element of university life, allowing for the development of community.

In 1925, the University Grants Committee identified the need for more halls of residence as the most urgent of its priorities. A report for the Committee of Vice Chancellors and Principals in 1948 found that, in 1937–38, the highest percentages of students in colleges and halls of residence (outside of Oxford and Cambridge) were at Exeter (79 per cent), Reading (76 per ent), Southampton (65 per cent), Nottingham (42 per cent), Bristol (36 per cent) and Durham (32 per cent across both Durham and Newcastle divisions); all other universities were below 25 per cent. Funding in the post-war period led to the construction of many new halls, with 67 built between 1944 and 1957. Yet the expansion of higher education in this same period meant that the proportion of students in halls hardly increased: while between 1943 and 1963 the number of students living at home fell from 42 per cent to 20 per cent, the number in private lodgings increased from 33 per cent to 52 per cent, leading to the Robbins Report identifying a need for "a very great increase in the housing provided by universities".

The post-war expansion in halls of residence meant universities looked for relatively cheap and quick construction, turning to functional modern architecture rather than the more traditional designs of earlier halls. Notable architects involved in designing halls of residence in this period included Basil Spence, who designed the University of Southampton's Highfield Campus and the University of Sussex, Denys Lasdun's "five minute university" at the University of East Anglia, including its 'ziggurat' halls of residence, and James Stirling's Andrew Melville Hall at the University of St Andrews, "one of the most significant post-war buildings in Scotland" according to Historic Environment Scotland.

==== Current halls of residence ====
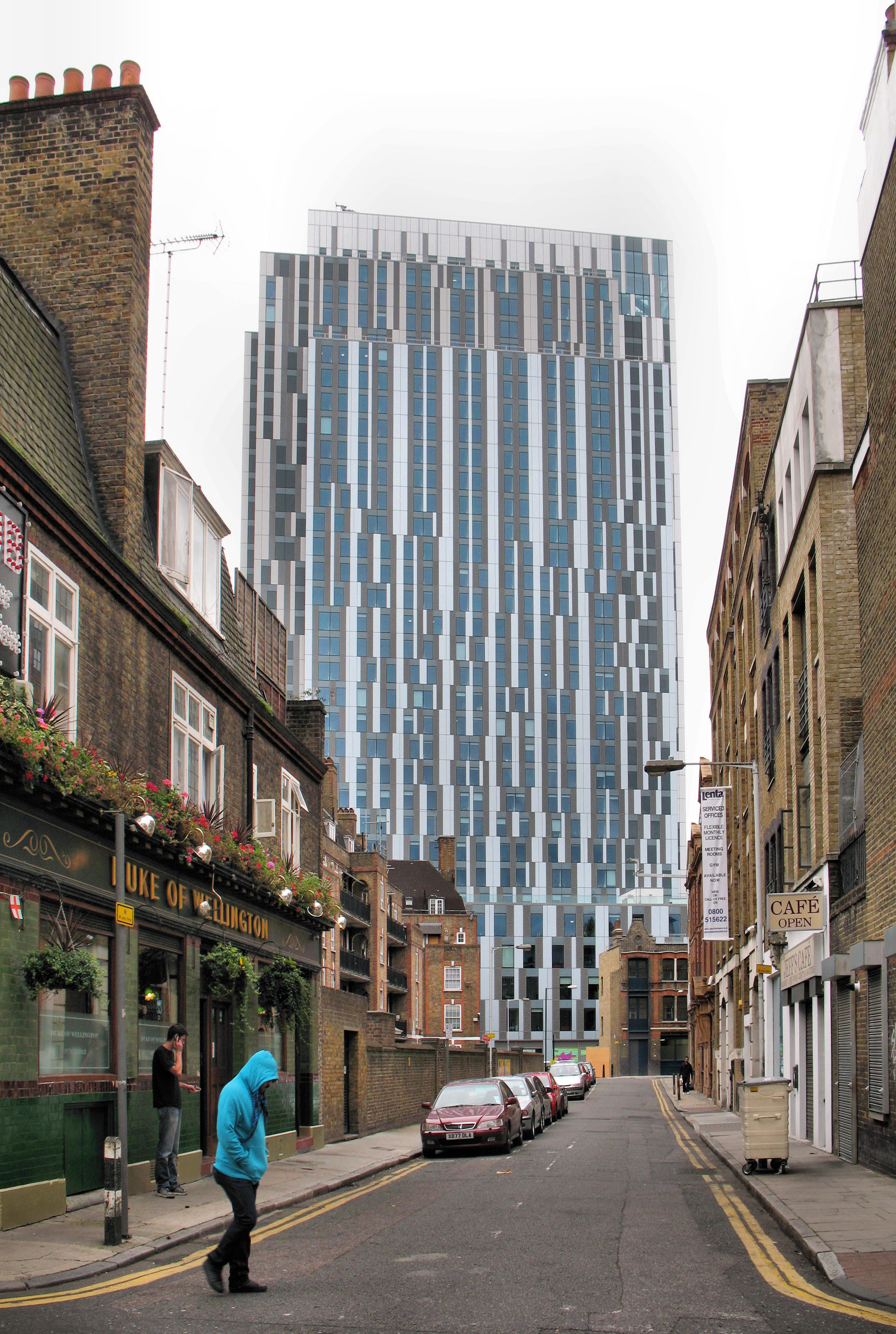
Chapter Spitalfields, a private hall of residence in London, England, was the tallest student accommodation building in the world when completed in 2010

Most UK universities provide accommodation in halls for first year students who make a firm acceptance of their offer, although this may not extend to students who enter via clearing. Halls accommodation most commonly consists of shared flats, but rooms may also be arranged 'dorm-style' along corridors. Rooms may be en suite or there may be a shared bathroom for the flat or corridor. Halls may be catered, part-catered or self-catered. Most universities offer single-sex flats within halls and there are a few halls (such as Aberdare Hall at Cardiff University) that are entirely single-sex, but others (such as University College London) offer only mixed accommodation. Most university or college-managed halls of residence are covered by Universities UK and Guild HE's accommodation code of practice.

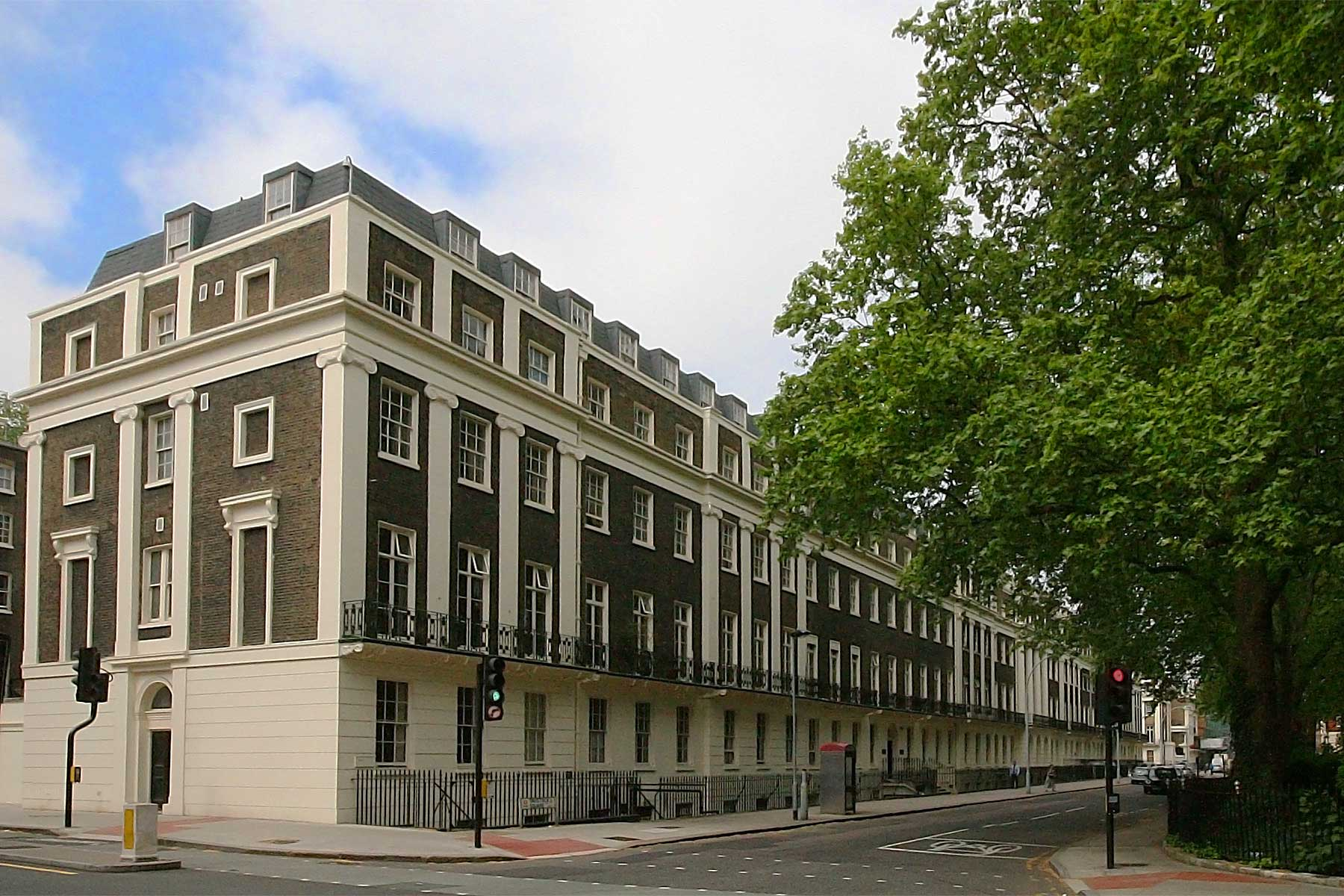
Connaught Hall, London, a University of London hall of residence

Private halls of residence, also known as purpose-built student accommodation (PBSA), are available in many university towns and cities. Many are covered by the Accreditation Network UK Code of Standards for Larger Developments, (Note: The code defines a larger development as "a development where more than 15 students live in one building in rooms off a central corridor, in cluster flats, or in self-contained flats") and housing services at some universities (such as the University of London) will only list accredited PBSAs. Many halls are delivered in partnership between educational establishments and private developers, and both codes include the same methodology for defining whether a hall counts as "managed and controlled by an educational establishment", making it a university hall, or is a private hall. Private halls may include facilities such as common rooms, gyms and study spaces. Private halls are often the most expensive accommodation option available in university towns. Some of the companies which have developed such accommodation are based offshore, which has led to concerns about tax avoidance and evasion of sanctions on Russian owners.

In the 2021/22 academic year, 347,680 (16 per cent) of the UK's 2,185,665 students were living in accommodation maintained by their higher education provider (either halls or colleges) and 200,895 (nine per cent) were in private-sector halls.

Within London, the London Plan that was adopted in 2021 specified that PBSAs had to have a minimum of 35 per cent of rooms rented at 55 per cent or less of the maximum student loan for London. However, this has had the effect of making PBSAs not financially viable in more expensive areas of London, so development of new PBSAs has been primarily in outer London. A majority of rooms, including all of the affordable rooms, also had to be linked to a university via a contractual nomination agreement. As this puts financial risks on the institutions, particularly with uncertainties over international student recruitment, this has led to the four richest institutions (Imperial College London, King's College London, London School of Economics and University College London) dominating the supply of new halls. Analysis of student numbers in London has shown that, as of 2024, 111,000 students are guaranteed a place in halls (including contracted private halls) by their universities but that there were only around 100,000 beds in university halls and private PBSAs. This has led University College London to remove their housing guarantee for incoming students and replace it with a system of priority groups.

Studies in Australia, New Zealand and the UK have shown that international students prefer to live in PBSAs while domestic students prefer houses in multiple occupation, raising concerns that PBSAs drive geographies of exclusion, with international and domestic students becoming segregated.

=== United States ===
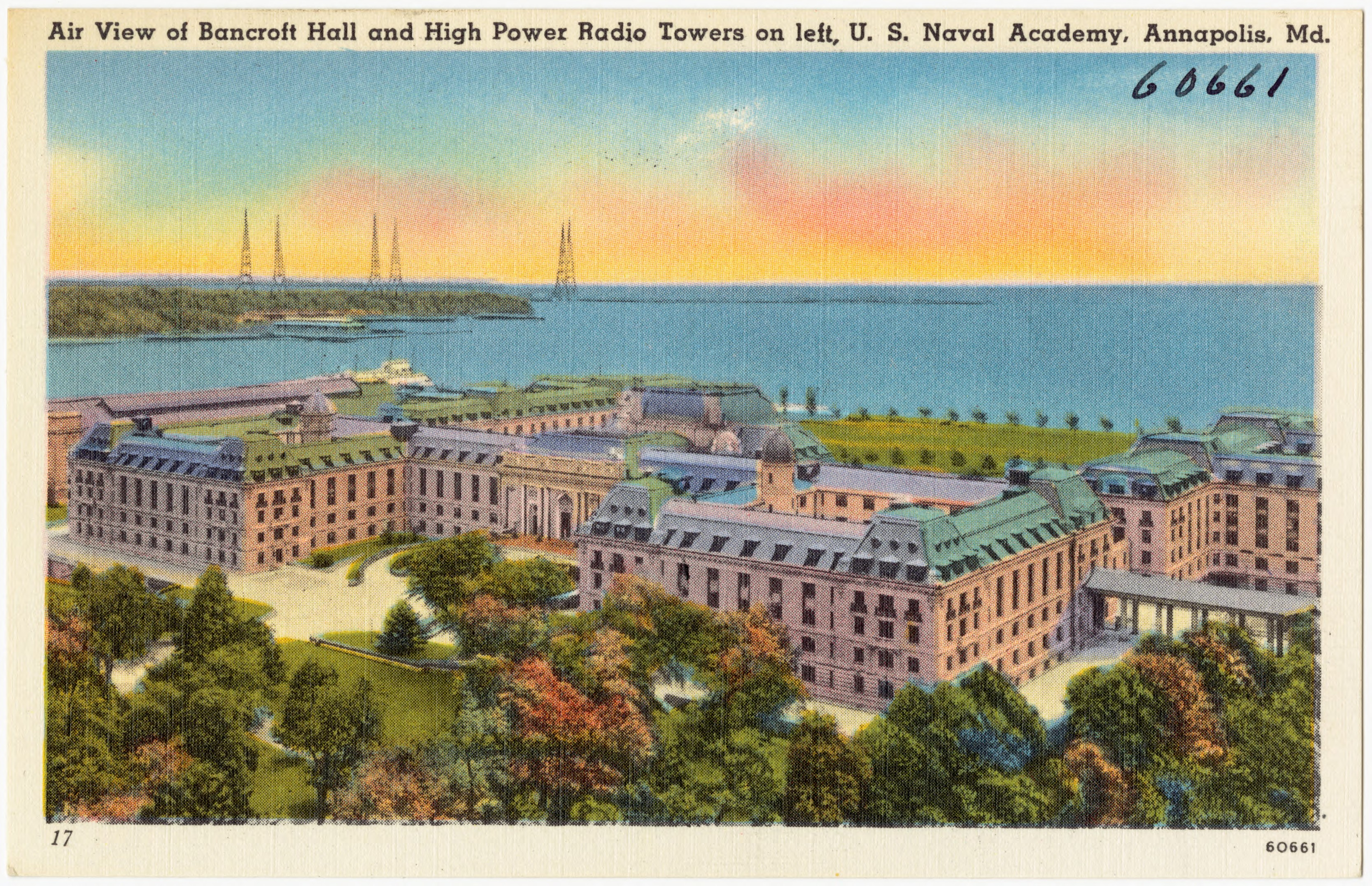
Aerial view of Bancroft Hall at the US Naval academy, said to be the largest dormitory building in the US

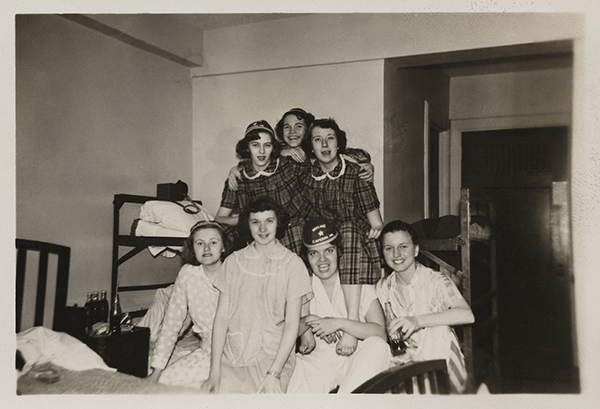
Jefferson Medical College Hospital School of Nursing students in their dormitory room c.1951

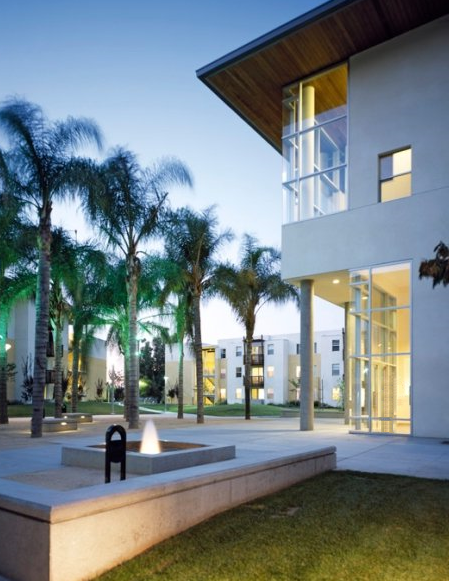
Residential suites at Cal Poly Pomona

In the early colonial colleges, residence was often provided for students within the main college building, such as the Wren Building at the William & Mary (1705) and Nassau Hall at Princeton (1756); these went on to inspire other "Old Main" buildings, combining academic functions with accommodation. The first primarily residential building was the Harvard Indian College (1650), which also contained a printing press, while the first exclusively residential building was Stoughton Hall (1698), also at Harvard.

Most colleges and universities provide single or multiple occupancy rooms for their students, usually at a cost. These buildings consist of many such rooms, like an apartment building. The largest dormitory building in the US is said to be Bancroft Hall at the United States Naval Academy, housing 4,400 midshipmen in 1,700 multiple occupancy rooms.

Many colleges and universities no longer use the word "dormitory" and staff are now using the term residence hall (analogous to the United Kingdom "hall of residence") or simply "hall" instead. Outside academia however, the word "dorm" or "dormitory" is commonly used without negative connotations. Indeed, the words are used regularly in the marketplace as well as routinely in advertising.

A United States residence hall room that holds two students is usually referred to as a "double". Certain residence halls have communal bathroom facilities, with no toilet facilities in the rooms themselves. In the United States, residence halls are sometimes segregated by sex, with men living in one group of rooms, and women in another. Some dormitory complexes are single-sex with varying limits on visits by persons of each sex. For example, the University of Notre Dame in Indiana has a long history of parietals, or mixed visiting hours. Most colleges and universities offer coeducational dorms, where either men or women reside on separate floors but in the same building or where both sexes share a floor but with individual rooms being single-sex. In the early 2000s, dorms that allowed people of opposite sexes to share a room became available in some public universities. Some colleges and university coeducational dormitories also feature coeducational bathrooms. Many newer residence halls offer single rooms as well as private bathrooms, or suite-style rooms.

Most residence halls are much closer to campus than comparable private housing such as apartment buildings. This convenience is a major factor in the choice of where to live since living physically closer to classrooms is often preferred, particularly for first-year students who may not be permitted to park vehicles on campus. Universities may therefore provide priority to first-year students when allocating this accommodation.

==== Hall councils ====
Halls may have student representative organisations, often connected to the residence life department, known as hall councils, area councils (for multiple halls in an area) or hall governments. At the campus level, there may be a residence hall association or an inter-hall council. These organise events and provide advocacy for resident students as opposed to the wider student body.

== See also ==
- Hazing in fraternities and sororities
