= Charlie Munger =

American businessman (1924–2023)

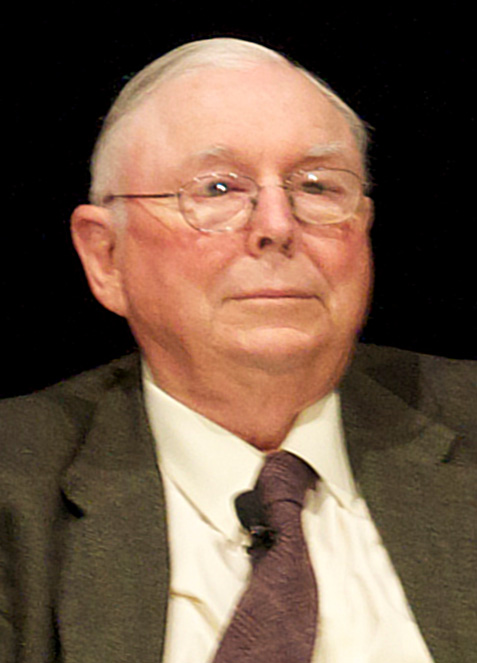
- Munger in 2010
- Born: Charles Thomas Munger; January 1, 1924; Omaha, Nebraska, U.S.
- Died: November 28, 2023 (aged 99); Santa Barbara, California, U.S.
- Education: University of Michigan; California Institute of Technology; Harvard University (JD)
- Occupations: Businessman; financial analyst; investor; philanthropist; lawyer
- Title: Vice Chairman of Berkshire Hathaway
- Spouses: Nancy Jean Huggins (m. 1945; div. 1953) Nancy Barry Borthwick (m. 1956; died 2010)
- Children: 7, including Charles Jr.
- Relatives: Thomas Charles Munger (grandfather)
- Military career
- Branch: United States Army
- Service years: 1943–1946
- Rank: Second lieutenant
- Unit: Army Air Forces
- Conflicts: World War II

Signature
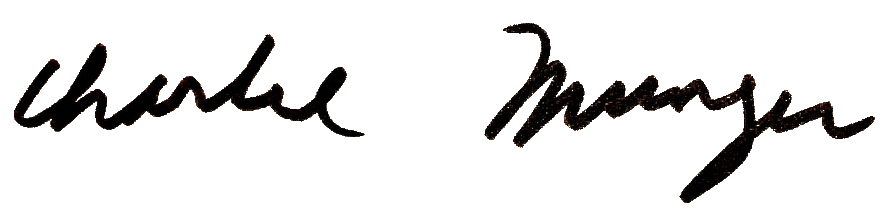

Charles Thomas Munger (January 1, 1924 – November 28, 2023) was an American businessman, investor, and philanthropist. He was the vice chairman of Berkshire Hathaway, the conglomerate controlled by Warren Buffett, from 1978 until his death in 2023. Buffett described Munger as his closest partner and right-hand man, and credited him with being the "architect" of modern Berkshire Hathaway's business philosophy.

In addition to his role at Berkshire Hathaway, Munger was a founding partner of the California law firm of Munger, Tolles & Olson; chairman of Wesco Financial Corporation from 1984 through 2011; chairman of the Daily Journal Corporation, based in Los Angeles, California; and a director of Costco Wholesale Corporation.

== Early life and education ==
Charles Thomas Munger was born on January 1, 1924, in Omaha, Nebraska, to Florence "Toody" Munger (née Russell) and Alfred Case Munger, a lawyer. As a teenager, he worked at Buffett & Son, a grocery store owned by Warren Buffett's grandfather, Ernest P. Buffett. His grandfather, Thomas Charles Munger, was a state representative and later a U.S. district court judge appointed by Theodore Roosevelt.

He enrolled in the University of Michigan, where he studied mathematics. During his time in college, he joined the fraternity Sigma Phi Society. In early 1943, a few days after his 19th birthday, he dropped out of college to serve in the U.S. Army Air Corps, where he became a second lieutenant. After receiving a high score on the Army General Classification Test, he was ordered to study meteorology at Caltech in Pasadena, California, the town he was to make his home.

Through the G.I. Bill, Munger took a number of advanced courses through several universities. When he applied to his father's alma mater, Harvard Law School, the dean of admissions rejected him because Munger had not completed an undergraduate degree. However, the dean relented after a call from Roscoe Pound, the former dean of Harvard Law and a Munger family friend. Munger excelled in law school, becoming a member of the Harvard Legal Aid Bureau and graduating in 1948 with a J.D., magna cum laude.

In college and the Army, he developed what he considered "an important skill": card playing. He used this in his approach to business. "What you have to learn is to fold early when the odds are against you, or if you have a big edge, back it heavily because you don't get a big edge often. Opportunity comes, but it doesn't come often, so seize it when it does come." He also used the card analogy to explain his approach to investing. He maintained that treating the shares of a company like baseball cards is a losing strategy because it requires one to predict the behavior of often irrational and emotional human beings.

== Career ==
Munger moved with his family to California, where he joined the law firm Wright & Garrett (later Musick, Peeler & Garrett). In 1962, he founded and worked as a real estate attorney at Munger, Tolles & Olson LLP. He then gave up the practice of law to concentrate on managing investments and later partnered with Otis Booth in real estate development. When he met Buffett over lunch at the Omaha Club, "the two began talking about investments and never stopped."

In 1962, Munger partnered with Jack Wheeler to form Wheeler, Munger, and Company, an investment firm with a seat on the Pacific Coast Stock Exchange. According to Buffett's essay "The Superinvestors of Graham-and-Doddsville", published in 1984, Munger's investment partnership generated compound annual returns of 19.8% during the 1962–75 period compared to a 5.0% annual appreciation rate for the Dow.

In 1974, Munger bought control of Mitchum, Jones, and Templeton, a publicly traded competitor of Wheeler Munger. Mitchum Jones was led by Bill Lupien and Joe Taussig. He wound up Wheeler, Munger, and Co. in 1976, after losses of 32% in 1973 and 31% in 1974. However, he took Mitchum Jones private at $3 per share and liquidated it 10 years later at $180 per share (a 60x gain). Lupien and Taussig later took over and managed Instinet, the first electronic stock exchange, which is now part of NASDAQ.

Munger was previously the chairman of Wesco Financial Corporation, now a wholly owned subsidiary of Berkshire Hathaway. The acquisition of this company was controversial following accusations that Buffett's company, Blue Chip, bought Wesco shares to defeat an impending merger between Wesco and Financial Corp. Wesco began as a savings and loan association, but eventually grew to control Precision Steel Corp., CORT Furniture Leasing, Kansas Bankers Surety Company, and other ventures. Wesco Financial also held a concentrated equity portfolio of over US$1.5 billion in companies such as Coca-Cola, Wells Fargo, Procter & Gamble, Kraft Foods, US Bancorp, and Goldman Sachs. Munger believed that holding a concentrated number of stocks that he knew extremely well would in the long term produce superior returns.

Wesco is based in Pasadena, California, Munger's adopted hometown. Pasadena was also the site of the company's annual shareholders' meeting, which were typically held on the Wednesday or Thursday after the more famous Berkshire Hathaway Annual Meeting. Munger's meetings were nearly as legendary in the investment community as those he co-hosted with Buffett in Omaha. Such meetings were often perfunctory, but Munger interacted with the other Wesco shareholders at considerable length, sometimes speculating about what Benjamin Franklin would do in a given situation. Meeting notes have been posted on the Futile Finance? website, but no updates exist beyond 2011.

Munger was also the chairman of the Daily Journal Corporation. After Wesco meetings ended, the Daily Journal annual meeting grew in importance, as investors flocked to the meeting to listen to him speak at length.

== Investment philosophy ==
=== "Elementary, worldly wisdom" ===
In multiple speeches, and in the 2005 book Poor Charlie's Almanack: The Wit and Wisdom of Charles T. Munger, "worldly wisdom" consists of a set of mental models framed as a latticework to help solve critical business problems.

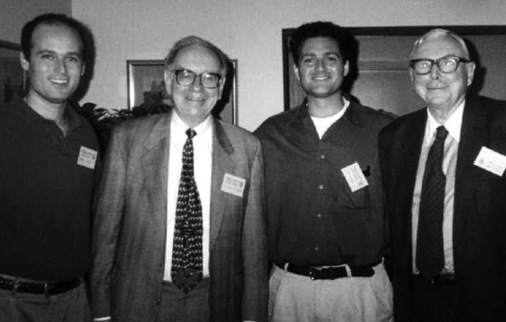
Munger (far right) and Warren Buffett (second from the left) in March 1998

Munger, along with Buffett, was one of the main inspirations behind the book Seeking Wisdom: From Darwin to Munger. Author Peter Bevelin explained his key learnings from both Munger and Buffett in a 2007 interview: "How to think about businesses and investing, how to behave in life, the importance of ethics and honesty, how to approach problems but foremost how to reduce the chance of meeting problems." Bevelin stated that previously, he "was lacking the Munger ability to un-learn my own best-loved ideas".

High ethical standards were integral to Munger's philosophy. One writer described his thinking as "Good businesses are ethical businesses. A business model that relies on trickery is doomed to fail." During an interview and Q&A session at Harvard-Westlake School on January 19, 2010, Munger referred to American philosopher Charles Frankel in his discussion on the 2008 financial crisis and the philosophy of responsibility. Munger explained that Frankel believed:

The system is responsible in proportion to the degree that the people who make the decisions bear the consequences. So to Charlie Frankel, you don't create a loan system where all the people who make the loans promptly dump them on somebody else through lies and twaddle, and they don't bear the responsibility when the loans are good or bad. To Frankel, that is amoral, that is an irresponsible system.

As part of his philosophy Munger lived in the same relatively modest California home for 70 years. When asked about living in more luxurious homes, Munger was quoted as stating: "in practically every case, they make the person less happy, not happier." Munger appreciated the utility of a "basic house" with few advantages over living in an ostentatious home. Munger appreciated modesty stating, "don't have a lot of envy" and "don't overspend your income". In Munger's last 2023 interview with CNBC he credited his success and longevity to a long-held sense of caution and ability "to avoid all standard ways of failing".

=== Lollapalooza effect ===
Munger used the term "Lollapalooza effect" for multiple biases, tendencies or mental models acting in compound with each other at the same time in the same direction. With the Lollapalooza effect, itself a mental model, the result is often extreme, due to the confluence of the mental models, biases or tendencies acting together, greatly increasing the likelihood of acting irrationally.

During a talk at Harvard in 1995 titled The Psychology of Human Misjudgment, Munger mentioned Tupperware parties and open outcry auctions, where he explained "three, four, five of these things work together and it turns human brains into mush," meaning that normal people will be highly likely to succumb to the multiple irrational tendencies acting in the same direction. In the Tupperware party, you have reciprocation, consistency, and commitment tendency, and social proof. (The hostess gave the party and the tendency is to reciprocate; you say you like certain products during the party so purchasing would be consistent with views you've committed to; other people are buying, which is the social proof.) In the open outcry auction, there is social proof of others bidding, reciprocation tendency, commitment to buying the item, and deprivation super-reaction syndrome, i.e. sense of loss. The latter is an individual's sense of loss of what he or she believes should be (or is) his or hers. These biases often occur at either conscious or subconscious level, and in both microeconomic and macroeconomic scale. Munger advised not attending such auctions.

=== Cryptocurrencies and Robinhood ===
Munger was critical of cryptocurrencies, referring to Bitcoin in particular as "noxious poison". He also said the use of cryptocurrency should be banned and said it was "beneath contempt"; that bitcoin was "stupid, "immoral," and "disgusting" and that "'It's like somebody else is trading turds and you decide, 'I can't be left out'"; and that it was like a venereal disease, among other things.

Munger has compared Robinhood to gambling, saying that its success is due to "people who know how to take advantage essentially of the gambling instincts of, not only American public, worldwide public" and further explained why he thinks individual investments without commission is tantamount to gambling. "If you cater to those gambling chips, when people have money in their pocket for the first time, and you tell them they can make 30 or 40 or 50 trades a day, and you're not charging them any commission, but you're selling their order flow or whatever, I hope we don't have more of it."

== Wealth and philanthropy ==
At the time of his death, Munger had an estimated net worth of $2.6 billion and was ranked as the 1,182nd richest person in the world, according to Forbes.

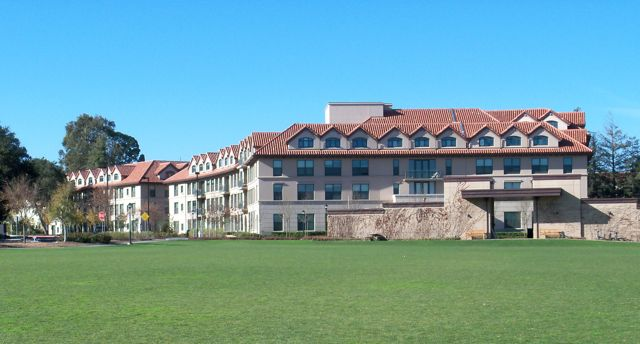
Munger Graduate Residence at Stanford University

Munger was a major benefactor of the University of Michigan. In 2007, Munger made a $3 million gift to the University of Michigan Law School for lighting improvements in Hutchins Hall and the William W. Cook Legal Research Building, including the noted Reading Room. In 2011, Munger made another gift to the Law School, contributing $20 million for renovations to the Lawyers Club housing complex, which covered the majority of the $39 million cost. The renovated portion of the Lawyers Club was renamed the Charles T. Munger Residences in the Lawyers Club in his honor.

In 1997, the Mungers donated $1.8 million to the Marlborough School in Los Angeles, of which Nancy Munger was an alumna. The couple also donated to the Polytechnic School in Pasadena and the Los Angeles YMCA.

On December 28, 2011, Munger donated 10 shares of Berkshire Hathaway Class A stock (then valued at approximately $1.2 million total) to the University of Michigan.

Munger and his late wife Nancy B. Munger were major benefactors of Stanford University. Nancy Munger was an alumna of Stanford, and Wendy Munger, Charlie Munger's daughter from a previous marriage, was also an alumna (A.B. 1972). Both Nancy and Wendy Munger served as members of the Stanford board of trustees.

In 2023, Munger made a gift of stock worth $40 million to the Henry E. Huntington Library and Art Museum in San Marino, California. He gave 77 Class A Berkshire Hathaway shares valued at more than $40.3 million to the Huntington, according to a filing with the Securities and Exchange Commission. A decade ago, he gave the institution nearly $33 million worth of Berkshire stock to help pay for a new education and visitors center.

Munger did not sign The Giving Pledge that was started by his partner Warren Buffett and co-director, Bill Gates, explaining that he "[could]n't do it" because "[he had] already transferred so much to [his] children that [he had] already violated it."

=== Architectural activities ===
Though Munger had no formal architectural training, he contributed heavily to numerous building designs, including dormitories at Stanford University and the University of Michigan, as well as his final home. He donated to universities on the precondition that the universities follow his architectural blueprints exactly. In multiple cases, Munger promoted key architectural concepts of his own liking, and ceded professional architectural responsibility to a licensed architect of record, e.g., Hartman-Cox Architects in the case of the dormitory at Michigan, and the firm of VTBS for the UC Santa Barbara residence hall.

In 2004, the Mungers donated 500 shares of Berkshire Hathaway Class A stock, then valued at $43.5 million, to Stanford to build a graduate student housing complex. The Munger Graduate Residence at Stanford University, funded and designed by Munger himself, opened in late 2009 and now houses 600 law and graduate students. The Munger family gave a major gift to Stanford's Green Library to fund the restoration of the Bing Wing as well as the construction of a rotunda on the library's second floor, and endowed the Munger Chair in Nancy and Charles Munger Professorship of Business at Stanford Law School.

Munger was a trustee of the Harvard-Westlake School in Los Angeles for more than 40 years, and previously served as chair of the board of trustees. His five sons and stepsons as well as at least one grandson graduated from the prep school. In 2006, Munger donated 100 shares of Berkshire Hathaway Class A stock, then valued at $9.2 million, to the school toward a building campaign at Harvard-Westlake's middle school campus. The Mungers had previously made a gift to build the $13 million Munger Science Center at the high school campus, a two-story classroom and laboratory building which opened in 1995 and has been described as "a science teacher's dream". The design of the Science Center was substantially influenced by Munger. In 2009, Munger donated eight shares of Berkshire Hathaway Class A stock, worth nearly $800,000, to Harvard-Westlake.

On April 18, 2013, the University of Michigan announced the single largest gift in its history: a $110 million gift from Munger to fund a new "state of the art" residence designed to foster a community of scholars, where graduate students from multiple disciplines can live and exchange ideas. The gift included $10 million for graduate student fellowships. Munger designed the residence, which houses 600 single bedrooms, most of which are windowless to accommodate a greater number of single-occupant bedrooms. Munger Graduate Residences at the University of Michigan opened in 2015.

In October 2014, Munger announced that he would donate $65 million to the Kavli Institute for Theoretical Physics at the University of California, Santa Barbara. This is the largest gift in the history of the school. The donation went toward construction of a premier residence building designed by Munger for visitors of the Kavli Institute in an effort to bring together physicists, as Munger stated, "to talk to one another, create new stuff, cross-fertilize ideas". The Charles T. Munger Physics Residence opened in January 2017.

In March 2016, Munger announced a further $200 million gift to UC Santa Barbara, conditioned on the university's commitment to spend it on the construction of Munger Hall, an undergraduate dormitory of Munger's own unconventional design preferences, notably windowless bedrooms and common areas, while tripling the record gift he gave for the Kavli Institute for Theoretical Physics. In October 2021, Munger's insistence that the university follow his design compelled architect Dennis McFadden, who had served the university for two decades, to resign from the university's Design Review Committee. McFadden stated that the windowless, 1.68-million-square-foot dormitory would be

unsupportable from my perspective as an architect, a parent, and a human being ... An ample body of documented evidence shows that interior environments with access to natural light, air, and views to nature improve both the physical and mental wellbeing of occupants ... The Munger Hall design ignores this evidence and seems to take the position that it doesn't matter ... [T]he building is a social and psychological experiment with an unknown impact on the lives and personal development of the undergraduates the university serves.

In August 2023, after widespread backlash to what critics called the "windowless dorm," UC Santa Barbara abandoned the project and began to solicit alternative housing proposals. Munger withdrew his pledge of support.

== Personal life ==
In 1945, while studying at Caltech, Munger married Nancy Huggins (c. 1926 – 2002). She was a Pasadena native who had been Munger's sister's roommate at Scripps College. They had three children, Wendy Munger (a former corporate lawyer, trustee of Stanford University, and trustee of The Huntington Library), Molly Munger (a civil rights attorney and funder of a ballot initiative to raise California taxes for public education), and Teddy Munger (deceased, leukemia, age 9). Munger and Huggins divorced in 1953.

Munger married Nancy Barry within a few years of his divorce from Huggins. Munger and Barry had four children: physicist and political donor Charles T. Munger Jr., Emilie Munger Ogden, Barry A. Munger, and Philip R. Munger. Munger also had two stepchildren from his second marriage: William Harold Borthwick and David Borthwick.

On February 6, 2010, Munger's second wife, Nancy Barry Munger, died at home at age 86.

Munger was a Republican and provided his opinions on a number of political topics including the policies of the Trump administration. Munger stated he was "not a normal Republican", for example advocating "Medicare for all" as a fix to the U.S. healthcare system, saying "I think we should have single-payer medicine eventually". Munger repeated his sentiments in another interview, praising Singapore's single-payer system in contrast to the U.S. "insane" system which is a "national disgrace".

In his 50s, after a failed eye cataract surgery that rendered his left eye blind, Munger had his left eye removed due to severe pain. When doctors told him he had developed sympathetic ophthalmia, which could lead to blindness in his remaining eye, Munger started taking braille lessons. The eye condition eventually receded and he kept eyesight in his right eye for the rest of his life.

== Death ==
Munger died at a Santa Barbara, California hospital on November 28, 2023, at the age of 99, 34 days shy of what would have been his 100th birthday. In the statement announcing his death, Warren Buffett said, "Berkshire Hathaway could not have been built to its present status without Charlie's inspiration, wisdom and participation." Other prominent figures in the American business community who issued statements in Munger's memory include Microsoft founder Bill Gates, Apple CEO Tim Cook, Chairman and CEO of JP Morgan Chase Jamie Dimon, Bank of America CEO Brian Moynihan and hedge fund manager Ray Dalio.

In the first annual letter to Berkshire Hathaway's shareholders written after Munger's death, Buffett gave a fuller account of his partner:

Charlie never sought to take credit for his role as creator but instead let me take the bows and receive the accolades. In a way his relationship with me was part older brother, part loving father. Even when he knew he was right, he gave me the reins, and when I blundered he never – never – reminded me of my mistake.

In the physical world, great buildings are linked to their architect while those who had poured the concrete or installed the windows are soon forgotten. Berkshire has become a great company. Though I have long been in charge of the construction crew; Charlie should forever be credited with being the architect.

Channel NewsAsia reported that deepfakes of Munger have been used in an AI-based disinformation campaign on YouTube targeting Singapore and prime minister Lawrence Wong.

== General and cited sources ==
- Bevelin, Peter (2007). Seeking Wisdom: From Darwin to Munger (ISBN 1-57864-428-3)
- Griffin, Tren (2015). Charlie Munger: The Complete Investor. (ISBN 023117098X)
- Kaufman, Peter (2005, 2006 [2nd ed.], 2008 [3rd ed.]). Poor Charlie's Almanack: The Wit and Wisdom of Charles T. Munger
- Labitan, Bud (2008). The Four Filters Invention of Warren Buffett and Charlie Munger, Acalmix (ISBN 978-0-615-24129-6)
- Lemann, Nicholas (2000). The Big Test: The Secret History of the American Meritocracy. Farrar, Straus and Giroux. ISBN 0-374-52751-2.
- Lowe, Janet (2000). Damn Right! Behind the Scenes with Berkshire Hathaway Billionaire Charlie Munger, John Wiley & Sons (ISBN 0-471-24473-2)
