= Wesco Financial =

U.S. financial services company (1959–2011)

Wesco Financial Corporation
- Type: Subsidiary
- Industry: Insurance; Renting; Steel
- Founded: 1959; 67 years ago
- Fate: Acquired by Berkshire Hathaway
- Headquarters: 301 East Colorado Boulevard, Pasadena, California, United States
- Key people: Charlie Munger (former chairman and CEO)
- Revenue: ▲US$12.236 billion (2020)
- Operating income: ▲US$347 million (2020)
- Net income: ▼US$70 million (2020)
- Total assets: ▲US$11.880 billion (2020)
- Total equity: ▲US$3336.389 million (2020)
- Owner: Berkshire Hathaway
- Number of employees: 2291 (14 at KBS, 2100 at CORT, 172 at Precision Steel, 5 at Wesco) (as of 2010)
- Website: www.wescofinancial.com

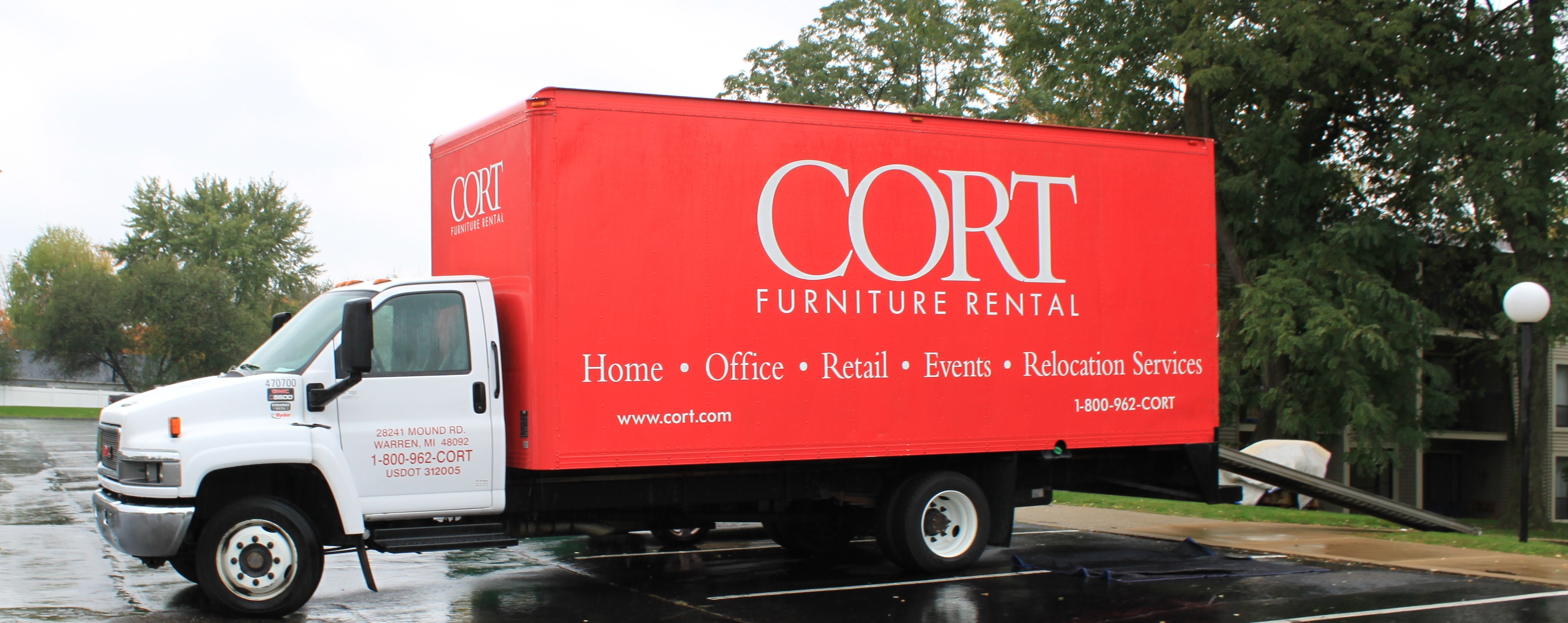
CORT moving van

Wesco Financial Corporation was an American diversified financial corporation headquartered in Pasadena, California. Wesco was originally the holding company for Mutual Savings, a savings and loan association. Mutual Savings' thrift operations were sold to CenFed Bank in 1993. It was for a long time 80.1% owned by Blue Chip Stamps, which has become completely and fully owned by Berkshire Hathaway, which is controlled by legendary investor Warren Buffett. Charlie Munger, the vice-chairman of Berkshire Hathaway and Buffett's business partner, was CEO and chairman of Wesco from 1984 to 2011. Munger, formerly a practicing attorney, is known for his straight-shooting style and his conduct at the discontinued Wesco shareholder meetings in Pasadena, where he used to interact with the outside investors at considerable length. In June 2011, Berkshire Hathaway acquired the approximately 20% of Wesco that it did not already own, making it a wholly owned subsidiary of that company.

Wesco Financial was previously likened to a miniature version of Berkshire Hathaway by certain observers, although Buffett and Munger cautioned investors that this was not an appropriate comparison. Like its parent company, Wesco provided insurance and reinsurance; it does so through subsidiaries Wesco-Financial Insurance Company and Kansas Bankers Surety. It also held shares in some of the same companies as Berkshire, like Coca-Cola, Kraft Foods, Procter & Gamble, and Wells Fargo. Controlling interests include CORT Business Services and Precision Steel Warehouse, which has steel service centers in Chicago and Charlotte, North Carolina.

== Subsidiaries ==
Wesco did business in three major categories; insurance, furniture rental, and steel service. The following wholly owned subsidiaries handled most of Wesco's business:

- Wesco-Financial Insurance, which was incorporated in 1985 and engages in the property and casualty insurance business. Wesco-Financial became part of National Indemnity.
- Kansas Bankers Surety Company, which was incorporated in 1909, purchased by Wesco in 1996 and provides specialized insurance coverages for banks. Kansas Bankers Surety became part of Berkshire Hathaway Homestate Companies.
- CORT Business Services Corporation, furniture rental.
- Precision Steel Warehouse, Inc., a chain of steel service centers. Precision Steel was founded in 1940 and acquired by Wesco in 1979.
- MS Property Company, which owns commercial real estate in Pasadena.
