= Franklin Otis Booth Jr. =

American billionaire and businessman

- Born: September 28, 1923; Pasadena, California, United States
- Died: June 15, 2008 (aged 84); Los Angeles, California, United States
- Education: Stanford University, California Institute of Technology
- Occupations: Newspaper executive, investor
- Known for: Los Angeles Times executive, early investor of Berkshire Hathaway
- Spouse: Married
- Children: 6

Franklin Otis Booth Jr. (September 28, 1923 – June 15, 2008) was an American billionaire newspaper executive and investor. He was a Los Angeles Times executive and early investor in Berkshire Hathaway, which made him a billionaire. Booth was also a philanthropist and a great-grandson of Gen. Harrison Gray Otis, founder of the Times.

== Career ==
During the 1950s, Booth was responsible for overseeing the printing of the newspaper. In 1968 he was named corporate vice president of Times Mirror Corporation in charge of forest products and commercial printing.

Booth's tenure at the Times overlapped with that of his second cousin and close friend, Otis Chandler, the publisher who held the reins of the paper from 1960 to 1980. The cousins shared a passion for the outdoors; Booth, also known as Otis, surfed, fished and hunted.

During his early years at the Times, Booth began investing in real estate with his friend Charles Munger, the vice chairman of Berkshire Hathaway Inc until his death in 2023. They worked on two real estate projects in Pasadena and quadrupled their money. It was Munger who introduced Booth to Warren Buffett in 1963. Booth's early decision to invest with Buffett left him with shares in Berkshire Hathaway amounting to a 1.4% stake in the company. Booth was a billionaire and one of the largest investors in the company, according to a 2005 Forbes magazine article cited in Booth's Times obituary.

In 1972 Booth retired from the Times and operated several businesses before trying his hand at citrus farming and raising livestock. Booth Ranches (brand name Otis Orchards) in the San Joaquin Valley consists of 9,000 acres (36 km^{2}) of orange groves, two citrus packinghouses and a cattle ranch.

== Personal life ==
Booth was born September 28, 1923, in Pasadena, where he spent his youth. By age 16 he was a student at the California Institute of Technology. He earned a bachelor's degree in electrical engineering in 1944 and then served two years in the U.S. Naval Reserve. After his discharge he earned a master's degree in business administration and a graduate degree in engineering in 1948, both from Stanford University.

Over the years, Booth donated to many causes including the Harvard-Westlake School and the Natural History Museum of Los Angeles County.

He was married and had six children.

He died June 15, 2008, in his home in Los Angeles from complications of ALS, also known as Lou Gehrig's disease.
