= Munger Hall =

Former planned dormitory at UC Santa Barbara

Munger Hall was a planned residence hall at the University of California, Santa Barbara designed by billionaire businessman Charlie Munger. The building's design meant that most rooms would not receive natural light, eliciting a negative reaction from students, architects, and community members. The project was cancelled in 2023.

== Description ==
Munger Hall was designed in the context of the entire University of California system struggling to build enough student housing to meet existing and projected demand. For the dormitory to have been built, it would have needed approval by the County of Santa Barbara, the University of California Regents, and the California Coastal Commission.

The 11 story, 1.68 million square foot building would have housed up to 4,500 students. The residential floors would be organized into eight “houses” of eight suites which each include eight single-occupancy beds, two bathrooms, and a common space. Due to how these suites were arranged, 94 percent of the students would not have had windows in their bedrooms. The building's design was conceived by Charlie Munger, who based the design philosophy on the interior rooms of a cruise ship. The building's architects were Van Tilburg, Banvard, & Soderbergh (VTBS). Munger donated $200 million to the project on the condition that the university follow his design exactly. The building was expected to cost $1.4 billion. The heating and hot water for the building would have been all electric, in compliance with UCSB environmental policies to avoid fossil fuels.

The design of Munger Hall was met with widespread negative attention, with specific criticism being directed towards the lack of natural light in most of the space. Dennis McFadden, an architect, resigned from the UCSB Design Review Committee in protest of the design saying it was “unsupportable from my perspective as an architect, a parent, and a human being.” The design was described by Paul Goldberger, New York Times architecture critic, as a "grotesque, sick joke — a jail masquerading as a dormitory". Architecture critic Rowan Moore criticized those in support of the building, calling their argument one with no bottom. The American Institute of Architects Los Angeles chapter released an open letter to the President of the University of California opposing the constitution of Munger Hall. A panel of experts and community members criticized the design in a 200-page report saying that it poses "significant health and safety risks that are predictable enough, probable enough and consequential enough”.

Plans to build the dormitory were cancelled in August 2023.
