= Kansas Bankers Surety Company =

U.S. insurance company

- Type: Subsidiary
- Industry: Insurance
- Founded: 1909; 117 years ago, in Kansas, United States
- Headquarters: Topeka, Kansas, United States
- Area served: Midwestern United States
- Products: Insurance; Surety bonds
- Parent: Berkshire Hathaway
- Website: kbsforbanks.com

Kansas Bankers Surety Company (KBS) is an insurance company based in the United States. It is a wholly owned subsidiary of Berkshire Hathaway, the investment vehicle of Warren Buffett. It specializes in the writing of surety bonds for the officers of small, state chartered banks in the Midwestern United States. It formerly also wrote deposit insurance at such banks for coverage in excess of the per-depositor limits of the Federal Deposit Insurance Corporation, but this line of business was discontinued in 2008.

Kansas Bankers Surety was acquired by Wesco Financial Corporation in 1996. Berkshire Hathaway had owned 80% of Wesco since the 1970s, and in 2010 it announced its intention to acquire the remainder and become 100% owner of Wesco. Kansas Bankers Surety became part of the Berkshire Hathaway Homestate Companies on December 31, 2013. As part of a 2015 rebranding, the company began referring to itself as simply KBS.

In 2016, KBS began non-renewing its financial institution crime bonds, directors and officers liability policies, and related coverages as it exited the market.
