= Chapter Spitalfields =

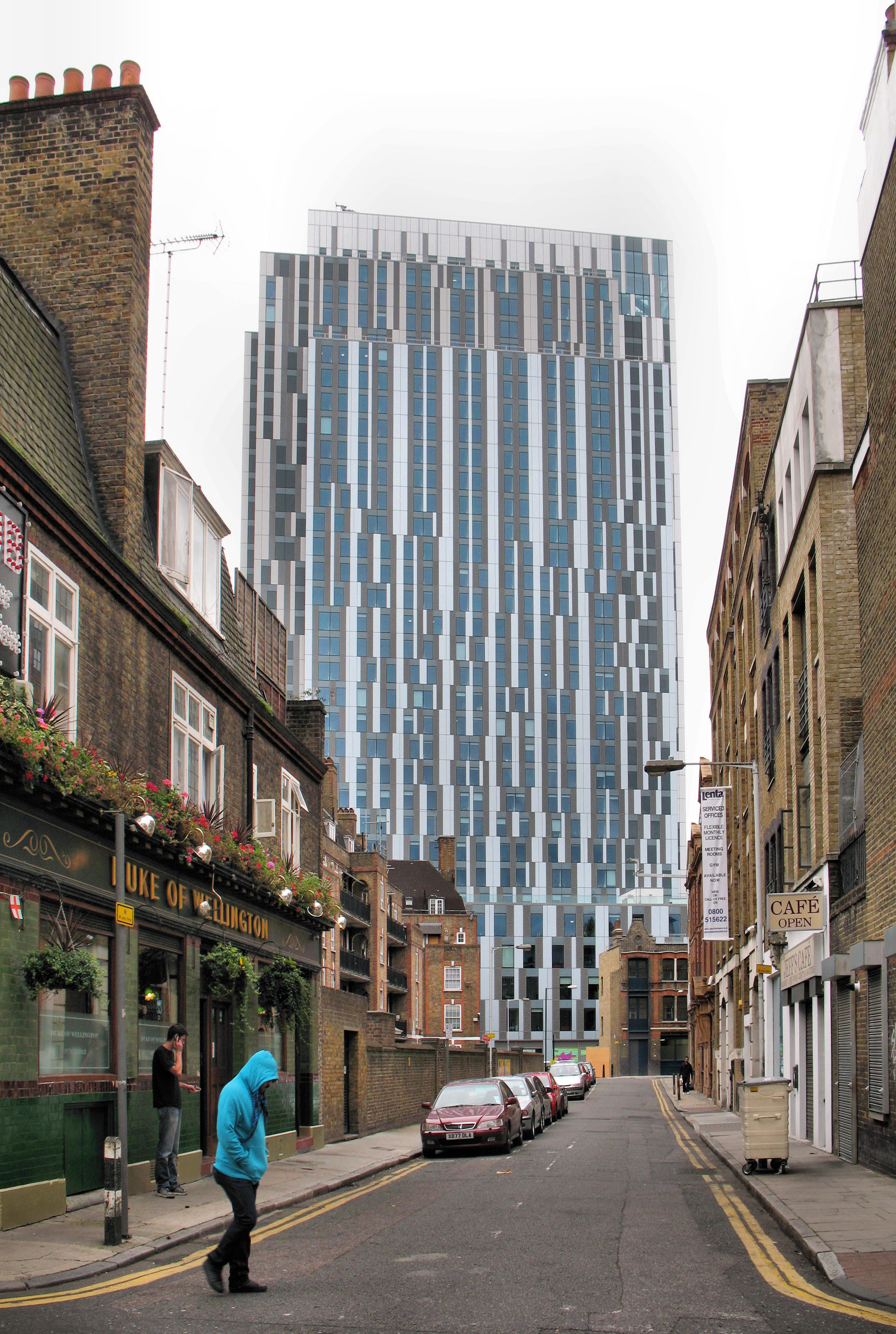
- Interactive map of the Chapter Spitalfields area
- Former names: Nido Spitalfields

General information
- Status: Completed
- Location: London, E1; United Kingdom
- Coordinates: 51.5175°N 0.077°W
- Construction started: 2007
- Completed: 2010

Height
- Roof: 112 metres (367 ft)

Technical details
- Floor count: 33

Design and construction
- Architect: TP Bennett Architects
- Developer: Nido Student Living

Chapter Spitalfields, originally known as Nido Spitalfields, is a student accommodation building located at 9 Frying Pan Alley in Spitalfields, Central London, England. It is one of the tallest student dormitories in the world, behind Altus House in Leeds. The 33-storey tower falls within the London Borough of Tower Hamlets, though Middlesex Street forms the boundary with the City of London, the principal financial district of the world. Middlesex Street forms part of the Petticoat Lane Market area.

Prior to construction of Nido, the plot at 100 Middlesex Street was occupied by a 1960-built office building, Rodwell House, which comprised an 8-storey block oriented north-south, surrounded by a single-storey office podium.

In 2015, Nido Spitalfields was purchased by Greystar Real Estate Partners, parent company of the student accommodation company, Chapter. Other Chapter buildings in London are located in the King's Cross area and Portobello.

The tower appears in the Doctor Who episode "The Wedding of River Song".

== Gallery ==
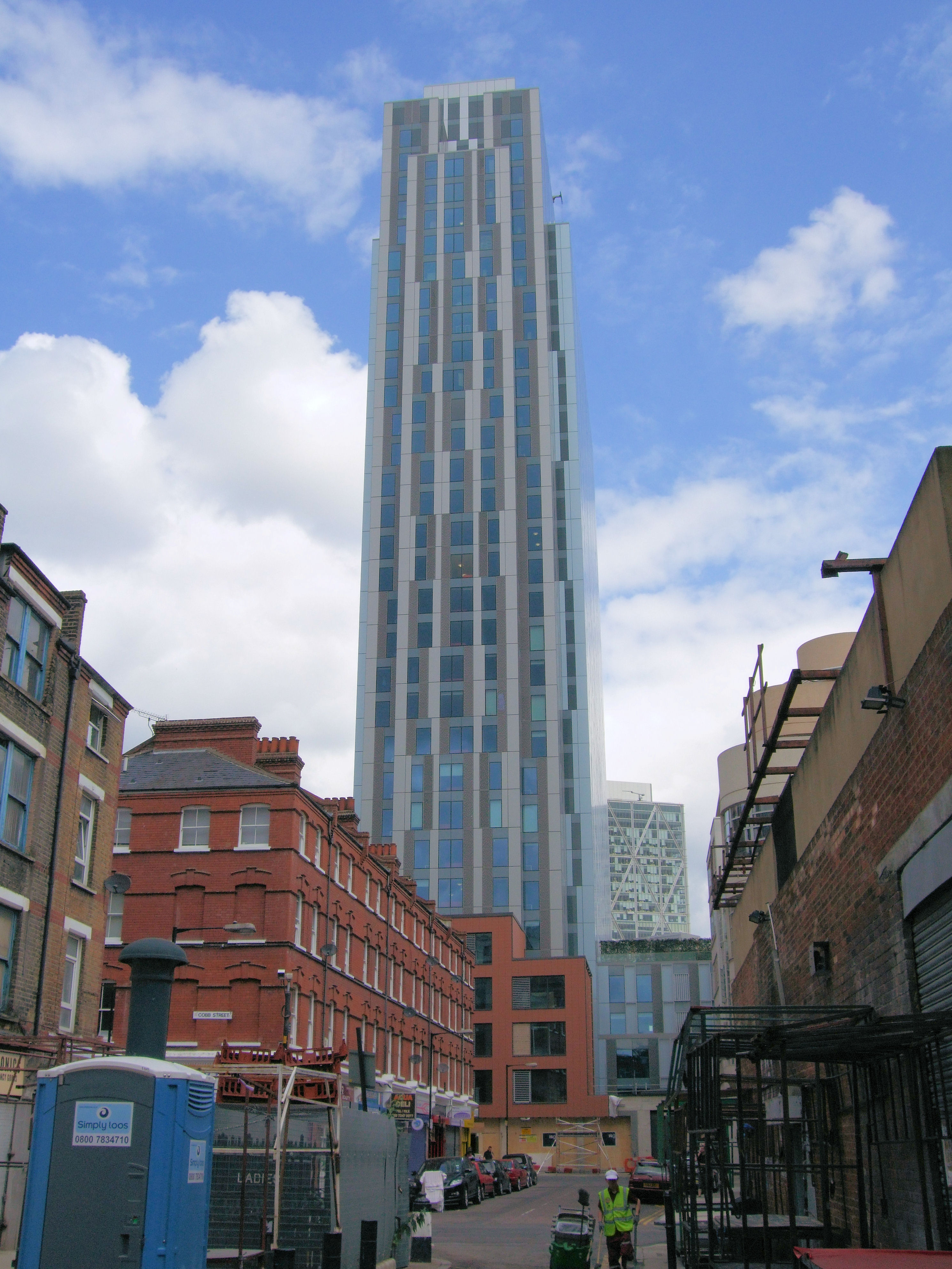
Side view

Nido on The City's skyline

== See also ==
- "Chapter".
