= Poor Charlie's Almanack =

Collection of speeches by Charlie Munger

- First edition
- Author: Peter D. Kaufman
- Language: English
- Subject: Investing
- Publisher: Donning Company
- Publication date: 2005 (1st edition); 2008 (expanded 3rd edition)
- Publication place: United States
- Pages: 480 (1st ed.), 532 (3rd ed.)
- ISBN: 1-57864-303-1
- OCLC: 250631679
- Dewey Decimal: 332.6/02/07 22
- LC Class: HG4515 .M86 2005

Poor Charlie's Almanack is a collection of speeches and talks by Charlie Munger, compiled by Peter D. Kaufman. First published in 2005 (ISBN 1-57864-303-1), it was released in an expanded edition (ISBN 1-578-64501-8) three years later. It was republished in 2023 by Stripe Press, shortly before Munger's death.

== Overview ==
Charlie Munger was the long-serving vice-chairman of Berkshire Hathaway. This book brings together his investing thoughts beyond his famous statement "I have nothing to add."

Munger admired Benjamin Franklin, and the book's title is a tribute to Franklin's Poor Richard's Almanack.

Net proceeds from sales of the book go to the Munger Research Center at the Huntington Library in San Marino, California.

== Contents ==
Munger propounds the 'Multiple Mental Models' approach to decision making. This collection of 'Big Ideas from Big Disciplines' contains an iconoclastic checklist for decision-making.

The book is written in an unconventional style. The ideas are not listed in an orderly fashion but just touched upon lightly, with pictures given alongside - in line with Munger's idea to "make the mind reach out to the idea" thereby increasing the idea's retentiveness in memory. The pictures serve to make the idea vivid by increasing their retentiveness and add a bit of geeky humor to the book.

The "Lollapalooza Effect" is Munger's term for the confluence of multiple biases; according to Munger, the tendency toward extremism results from such confluences. These biases often occur at either conscious or subconscious level, and at both microeconomic and macroeconomic scales.

The 25 Cognitive Biases is also explained in the book. Munger explains why people are so psychologically flawed, leading to mistakes in decision making.

== Eleven talks ==
The book includes some talks given by Munger:

- Harvard-Westlake School Commencement June 13, 1986 (Read online)
- "A Lesson in Elementary, Worldly Wisdom as It Relates to Investment Management and Business", University of Southern California Marshall School of Business, April 14, 1994 (Read online)
- "A Lesson in Elementary, Worldly Wisdom, Revisited", Stanford Law School, April 19, 1996
- "Practical Thought About Practical Thought?", July 20, 1996
- "The Need for More Multidisciplinary Skills from Professionals: Educational Implications Harvard Law School Class of 1948, April 24, 1998
- "Investment Practices of Leading Charitable Foundations", Foundation Financial Officers Group, October 14, 1998
- Breakfast Meeting of the Philanthropy Roundtable, November 10, 2000
- "The Great Financial Scandal of 2003", Summer 2000
- "Academic Economics: Strengths and Faults after Considering Interdisciplinary Needs", Herb Kay undergraduate lecture University of California, Santa Barbara, October 3, 2003
- The University of Southern California (USC) Gould School of Law Commencement Address, May 13, 2007 (added in the third edition)
- The Psychology of Human Misjudgment, updated in 2005 (Read the original 1995 version online).

== Reviews ==
In November 2005, Kiplinger's Newsletter wrote "Munger, 81, has always been media shy. That changed when Peter Kaufman compiled Munger's writing and speeches in a new book, Poor Charlie's Almanack: The Wit and Wisdom of Charles T. Munger "

In August 2006, The Motley Fool wrote: "With 512 pages, there is something for everyone, and Poor Charlie's Almanack is an impressive and thorough tribute to one of the brightest, most pragmatic, and iconoclastic investment minds ever."
