= Russell Indexes =

Stock market indices

Russell indexes are a family of global stock market indices from FTSE Russell that allow investors to track the performance of distinct market segments worldwide. Many investors use mutual funds or exchange-traded funds based on the FTSE Russell Indexes as a way of gaining exposure to certain portions of the U.S. stock market. Additionally, many investment managers use the Russell Indexes as benchmarks to measure their own performance. Russell's index design has led to more assets benchmarked to its U.S. index family than all other U.S. equity indexes combined.

The best-known index of the series is the Russell 2000, which tracks US small-cap stocks and roughly consists of the bottom 2,000 stocks in the Russell 3000 index.

== History ==
Russell Investments' indices began in 1984 when the firm launched its family of U.S. indices to measure U.S. market segments and hence better track the performance of investment managers. The resulting methodology produced the broad-market Russell 3000 Index and sub-components such as the small-cap Russell 2000 Index. Using a rules-based and transparent process, Russell forms its indexes by listing all companies in descending order by market capitalization adjusted for float, which is the actual number of shares available for trading. In the United States, the top 3,000 stocks (those of the 3,000 largest companies) make up the broad-market Russell 3000 Index. The top 1,000 of those companies make up the large-cap Russell 1000 Index, and the bottom 2,000 (the smallest companies) make up the small-cap Russell 2000 Index.

In 2014, London Stock Exchange Group (LSEG) acquired Russell Investments for $2.7 billion. LSEG separated Russell Indexes from the rest of Russell Investments, and later sold Russell Investments in 2020. In 2015, LSEG announced the FTSE Russell brand for its indexing business.

== Construction methodology ==
The Russell indexes are objectively constructed based on transparent rules. The broadest U.S. Russell Index is the Russell 3000E Index which contains the 4,000 largest (by market capitalization) companies incorporated in the U.S., plus (beginning with the 2007 reconstitution) companies incorporated in an offshore financial center that have their headquarters in the U.S.; a so-called "benefits-driven incorporation". If 4,000 eligible securities do not exist in the U.S. market, the entire eligible set is included. Each Russell Index is a subset of the Russell 3000E Index and broken down by market capitalization and style. The members of the Russell 3000E Index and its subsets are determined each year during annual reconstitution and enhanced quarterly with the addition of initial public offerings (IPOs). The Russell 3000E Index represents approximately 99 percent of the U.S. equity market. Russell excludes stocks trading below $1, stocks that trade on the pink sheets and OTC Bulletin Board, closed-end mutual funds, limited partnerships, royalty trusts, non-U.S. incorporated stocks (other than the benefits driven incorporations described above), foreign stocks, and American Depositary Receipts (ADRs).

== Annual reconstitution ==
Russell rebalances its indexes once each year in June, called "reconstitution". The reconstitution consists of updating the global list of investable stocks and assigning them to the appropriate indices. The Russell indexes do not immediately replace a company that merges with another firm or has its stock delisted. However, Russell adds initial public offerings (IPOs) on a quarterly basis, capturing these stocks in a systematic way.

Abnormal trading volumes caused by index fund managers re-balancing their portfolios has a history of significant market impact during the last few seconds before the New York Stock Exchange and NASDAQ closing prices are determined.

The index rebalance is typically scheduled for the closing price on the last Friday in June.

== Primary indexes ==
In addition to the primary indices listed below, Russell publishes Value and Growth versions of each U.S. index. This divides each index roughly in half, separating companies classified as value stocks from those classified as growth stocks. Companies can appear in both the value and growth versions of an index, though the total number of shares between the value and growth versions will equal the number in the main index. The primary indices are:

=== Extended market indices ===
- Russell 3000 Index: The Russell 3000 Index measures the performance of the largest 3,000 U.S. companies representing approximately 98% of the investable U.S. equity market.

=== Large cap indices ===
- Russell 1000 Index: The large-cap index of the top 1,000 stocks in the Russell 3000 Index.
- Russell Top 500 Index: Another large-cap index, consisting of the top 500 stocks in the Russell 1000 Index.
- Russell Top 200 Index: The mega-cap index of the very largest 200 stocks in the Russell 1000 Index.
- Russell Top 100 Index: Mega-cap index of the top 100 stocks in the Russell 1000 Index.
- Russell Top 50 Mega Cap Index: Measures the performance of the 50 largest mega-cap companies in the Russell 1000 Index.
- Russell Top 20 Index: Mega-cap index of the top 20 stocks in the Russell 1000 Index.
- Russell Top 10 Index: Mega-cap index of the top 10 stocks in the Russell 1000 Index.

=== Mid cap indices ===
- Russell 2500 Index: A mid-cap to small-cap index of the bottom 2,500 stocks in the Russell 3000 Index. The Russell Top 500 Index plus the Russell 2500 Index yields the Russell 3000 Index.
- Russell Midcap Index: The bottom 800 stocks in the Russell 1000 Index. The Russell Top 200 Index plus the Russell Midcap Index yields the Russell 1000 Index.

=== Small cap indices ===
- Russell 2000 Index: The small-cap benchmark index of the bottom 2,000 stocks in the Russell 3000 Index.
- Russell Microcap Index: A micro-cap index of the stocks ranked from 2,001-4,000 in the Russell indexing universe, consisting of capitalizations ranging from about $50 million to $2.5 billion. Hence, this is an index of the 1,000 smallest Russell 3000 stocks, plus the 1,000 smaller stocks.
- Russell Small Cap Completeness Index: The index includes stocks from the Russell 3000 Index that do not appear in the S&P 500 Index. The Index measures the performance of the Russell 3000 companies excluding S&P 500 constituents.

=== Russell indices in Japan ===
Russell/Nomura equity indices for Japan (calculated with Nomura Securities Co., Ltd.) offer free-float adjusted broad market or style benchmarks for investors in that country.

== See also ==
- Russell Investments
