= Russell Small Cap Completeness Index =

Stock market index

- Foundation: April 1, 2000; 24 years ago
- Operator: FTSE Russell
- Exchanges: New York Stock Exchange; Nasdaq; OTC Markets Group
- Trading symbol: ^RSCC
- Constituents: 2,561 (April 30, 2021)
- Type: Small-cap
- Weighting method: Free-float capitalization-weighted
- Related indices: Russell 3000 Index
- Website: ftse.com/products/indices/russell-us

The Russell Small Cap Completeness Index measures the performance of the companies in the Russell 3000 Index excluding the companies in the S&P 500. As of 30 April 2021, the index contains 2,561 holdings. It provides a performance standard for active money managers seeking a liquid extended benchmark, and can be used for a passive investment strategy in the extended market. Weighted average market capitalization is approximately $15.4 billion.

The index, which was launched on April 1, 2000, is maintained by FTSE Russell, a subsidiary of the London Stock Exchange Group. Its ticker symbol is ^RSCC.

== Top 10 holdings ==
- Square Inc. (NYSE: SQ)
- Uber Technologies (NYSE: UBER)
- Zoom Video Communications (Nasdaq: ZM)
- Twilio Inc. (NYSE: TWLO)
- Moderna (Nasdaq: MRNA)
- Workday Inc. (Nasdaq: WDAY)
- DocuSign (Nasdaq: DOCU)
- Veeva Systems (NYSE: VEEV)
- Lululemon Athletica (Nasdaq: LULU)
- Roku Inc. (Nasdaq: ROKU)

(As of 30 April 2021)

== Top sectors by weight ==
- Financial Services
- Consumer Discretionary
- Technology
- Producer Durables
- Health Care

== See also ==
- Russell Indexes
- Russell 2500 Index
- Wilshire 4500
