= Megacap stock =

Shares offered by a very large company in terms of value

In business and investing, a megacap stock (also mega-cap or mega cap) is a stock whose market capitalization (market cap) is among the very largest. These are stocks of the largest publicly traded companies in the world. The market capitalization of a stock is the total value of the shares outstanding, calculated as (shares outstanding x share price). Stocks with large market caps, but smaller than megacaps, instead fall within the large-cap segment of the stock market.

There is no official definition of, or full consensus agreement about, the exact market cap cutoff value for a stock to qualify as megacap, and it may vary internationally. However, for the 2020s US market, a minimum market cap value of $200 billion is often cited. Index providers, investment funds, and investment managers may have other definitions.

== Definitions and investments ==
In the US, according to investor education materials published by the Financial Industry Regulatory Authority (FINRA) in 2022, the megacap segment is typically (though not officially) defined as stocks with a market cap of at least $200 billion, which is equivalent to at least $219 billion in 2025 using GDP deflator adjustment. Stock Investing For Dummies (2024; 7th edition) gives a definition of megacap which matches FINRA's.

=== Indices ===
Several stock market indices have been created which attempt to measure the megacap segment of the US stock market, and thus implicitly define versions of the megacap segment. Index funds have been created which track some of those indices.

The Morningstar US Mega Cap Index "is designed to measure the performance of mega-cap US stocks, representing the top 70% of the investable market". Accordingly, as of June 2026, Morningstar Indexes defined its US megacap segment as companies with market caps greater than $94,234,256,812. As of August 31, 2026, the index contained 172 companies. The Vanguard Group issues an index ETF (NYSE Arca: MGC) that tracks this index.

At initial creation circa February 2024, the MSCI USA Mega Cap Select Index consisted of companies in the MSCI USA Index with market caps of at least $200 billion. As of June 2026, the index's rules constrain it to contain 30 to 50 constituents. If possible while still complying with that minimum constituents requirement, new additions to the index are required to have a market cap of at least $220 billion. As of May 29, 2026, the index contained 50 constituents, with market caps ranging from $98.4 billion to $4.84 trillion.

The Russell Top 200 Index is officially described as "[measuring] the performance of the mega cap segment of the US equity market". As of April 30, 2026, the Russell Top 200 contained 198 constituents, with market caps ranging from $62.1 billion to $4.85 trillion. The narrower Russell Top 50 Mega Cap Index consists of the 50 largest companies in the Russell 3000 at the time of index reconstitution. As of April 30, 2026, the Russell Top 50 Mega Cap Index contained 51 constituents, with market caps ranging from $216.6 billion to $4.85 trillion. The even narrower Russell Top 10 Index consists of the 10 largest companies in the Russell 3000 at the time of index reconstitution. As of May 29, 2026, the Russell Top 10 Index contained 11 constituents, with market caps ranging from $873 billion to $4.93 trillion.

A 2025 article by S&P Dow Jones Indices describes its own S&P 100, S&P 500 Top 50 (ticker: SP5T5), S&P 500 Top 20 (ticker: SP5T2), and S&P 500 Top 10 (ticker: SP5T1) indices as "mega-cap indices". As of May 29, 2026, the S&P 100 index's methodology required a minimum market cap of $22.7 billion, and the index's 101 constituents had actual market caps ranging from $55.1 billion to $5.13 trillion. As of May 29, 2026, the S&P 500 Top 50 Index contained 51 constituents, with market caps ranging from $92.3 billion to $5.13 trillion. Invesco issues an index ETF (NYSE Arca: XLG) that tracks the S&P 500 Top 50 Index. As of May 29, 2026, the S&P 500 Top 20 Index contained 21 constituents, with market caps ranging from $316 billion to $5.13 trillion. The S&P 500 Top 20 Select Index (ticker: SPXT2SUP) is a capped variant of the S&P 500 Top 20 Index, limiting any single company's weight in the index to a maximum of 22.5%, and limiting companies with weights above 4.5% to collectively constitute at most 48% of the index's weight. BlackRock iShares issues an index ETF (NYSE Arca: TOPT) that tracks the S&P 500 Top 20 Select Index.

=== Active funds ===
A few actively managed investment funds have been created which target the megacap segment of the US stock market. They explicitly give their own definitions of the megacap segment when explaining their investment strategies.

The Fidelity Mega Cap Stock Fund mutual fund (ticker symbol: FGRTX) defines megacaps as companies "whose market capitalization is similar to [that] of companies in the Russell Top 200 Index or the S&P 100 Index". As of December 31, 2025, the fund had 116 holdings.

The Principal US Mega-Cap ETF (Nasdaq: USMC) defines megacaps as companies "with market capitalizations in the top 50th percentile of the S&P 500 Index". As of September 30, 2025, such companies had market caps ranging from $149.6 billion to $4.6 trillion. As of June 30, 2025, the fund had 27 holdings.

== History ==
The origin and first recorded use of the term megacap (or any of its various spellings), in relation to stock capitalization, is unclear. It dates back to at least 1997, if not earlier.

The S&P 100 was launched on June 15, 1983. The Russell Top 200 Index was launched on September 1, 1992. The Fidelity Mega Cap Stock Fund's inception was on December 28, 1998.

The Russell Top 50 Mega Cap Index was launched on January 1, 2005. Also in 2005, investment advisory executive Richard Imperiale noted that some investors were classifying "the top 10 percent of companies by market cap" into a mega cap segment of the stock market.

In 2009, the third edition of Stock Investing For Dummies defined mega caps (and ultra caps) as companies with market caps over $50 billion. Subsequent editions used that definition until 2020, when the sixth edition redefined them as having market caps over $200 billion. The 2023 version, retitled Investing in Stocks For Dummies, used the same definition as the sixth edition.

The Morningstar US Mega Cap Index was established on March 31, 2011.

In 2011, Investing Demystified defined mega-caps as companies with market caps of at least $25 billion, whereas in the same year, The Complete Idiot's Guide to Stock Investing defined them as having market caps at least $50 billion. That's equivalent to $35 billion and $70 billion, respectively, in 2025 using GDP deflator adjustment. In 2014, Asset Allocation Demystified stated that a typical mega cap company had a market cap of over $50 billion.

The S&P 500 Top 50 Index was launched on November 30, 2015.

In 2016, Beginning Investing defined US mega-caps as having market caps over $100 billion (equivalent to $131 billion in 2025 using GDP deflator adjustment).

The Principal US Mega-Cap Multi-Factor Index ETF (ticker: USMC) was incepted on October 11, 2017, as an index fund tracking the Nasdaq US Mega Cap Select Leaders Index. However, starting June 10, 2022, it was renamed to the Principal US Mega-Cap ETF and switched to an active management strategy.

The S&P 500 Top 10 Index was launched on July 14, 2023.

The MSCI USA Mega Cap Select Index was created circa February 2024. The S&P 500 Top 20 Index was launched on August 1, 2024. In the same year, the seventh edition of Stock Investing For Dummies was published; it continued to use $200 billion as the minimum market cap cutoff for megacaps, unchanged from the sixth edition.

== Stocks with market caps over $200 billion ==
The following stocks had market caps over $200 billion in the second quarter of 2023:

Company	2023 approximate market cap	Stock Symbol
TSMC	515 billion	TSM
Visa	499 billion	V
UnitedHealth Group	436 billion	UNH
Walmart	423 billion	WMT
Johnson & Johnson	419 billion	JNJ
JPMorgan Chase	418 billion	JPM
ExxonMobil	416 billion	XOM
Mastercard	369 billion	MA
Procter & Gamble	358 billion	PG
Novo Nordisk	354 billion	NVO
Broadcom	349 billion	AVGO
Oracle Corporation	313 billion	ORCL
The Home Depot	303 billion	HD
Chevron Corporation	285 billion	CVX
Merck & Company	283 billion	MRK
ASML Holding N.V.	275 billion	ASML
Coca-Cola Company	261 billion	KO
PepsiCo	257 billion	PEP
AbbVie	242 billion	ABBV
Costco	238 billion	COST
Bank of America	225 billion	BAC
Adobe	220 billion	ADBE
Toyota	217 billion	TM
McDonald's	215 billion	MCD
Alibaba Group	214 billion	BABA
Cisco Systems	208 billion	CSCO
BHP	208 billion	BHP
Novartis	207 billion	NVS
Salesforce	204 billion	CRM
AstraZeneca	202 billion	AZN
Pfizer	201 billion	PFE

== See also ==
- Market capitalization § Market cap terms, including large-cap and mid-cap
- Small-cap
- Microcap stock, including nano-caps
- Magnificent Seven (stocks)
- Market price
- Authorised capital
- Treasury stock
