= Russell Top 50 Index =

American stock market index

Russell Top 50 Mega Cap
- Foundation: January 1, 2005; 21 years ago
- Operator: FTSE Russell
- Exchanges: New York Stock Exchange
- Trading symbol: ^RU50
- Constituents: 50
- Type: Mega cap
- Weighting method: Capitalization-weighted
- Related indices: Russell 3000 Index
- Website: www.lseg.com/en/ftse-russell/indices/russell-us

The Russell Top 50 Index (formally, the Russell Top 50 Mega Cap Index) is a megacap stock market index that measures the performance of the largest companies in the Russell 3000 Index. It includes approximately 50 of the largest securities based on a combination of their market cap and current index membership and represents approximately 40% of the total market capitalization of the Russell 3000.

The index was launched on January 1, 2005 by Russell Investments and is maintained by FTSE Russell, a subsidiary of the London Stock Exchange Group. Its ticker symbol is ^RU50.

The index is effectively a subset of the Russell Top 200, which is FTSE Russell's wider, comprehensive megacap index. In turn, both are effectively subsets of the large-cap Russell 1000.

Its competitors include the S&P 500 Top 50 index.

== Investing ==
Prior to January 27, 2016, the index was tracked by an exchange-traded fund, the Guggenheim Russell Top 50 Mega Cap ETF (NYSE Arca: XLG). The ETF switched to the S&P 500 Top 50 Index.

== Subsets ==
A couple Russell Indexes are effectively subsets of the Russell Top 50:

- Russell Top 20 Index
- Russell Top 10 Index

These indices respectively compete with the S&P 500 Top 20 and S&P 500 Top 10 indices.

== Top 10 holdings ==
- Apple Inc. (Nasdaq: AAPL)
- Microsoft Corp (Nasdaq: MSFT)
- Amazon.com (Nasdaq: AMZN)
- Meta Platforms (Nasdaq: META)
- Alphabet Inc Class A (Nasdaq: GOOGL)
- Alphabet Inc Class C (Nasdaq: GOOG)
- Berkshire Hathaway Inc (NYSE: BRK.B)
- Johnson & Johnson (NYSE: JNJ)
- Procter & Gamble (NYSE: PG)
- Visa Inc. (NYSE: V)

(as of October 31, 2020)

== Top sectors by weight ==
- Technology
- Consumer Discretionary
- Health Care
- Industrials
- Financials

== See also ==
- S&P 100 - a roughly comparable US megacap/large-cap stock index
