= Microcap stock =

Shares offered by a relatively small company in terms of value

A microcap stock is a public company that has a very small market capitalization, below the cutoff for small-cap stocks. Depending on the market segmentation system in use, nanocap stocks are either a subset of the smallest microcaps, or a distinct segment of stocks with market capitalizations even smaller than those of microcaps. In the US, many microcap and nanocap stocks are traded over-the-counter with their prices quoted on the OTCBB, OTC Link LLC, or the Pink Sheets, as opposed to via a stock exchange. The larger, more established US micro-caps are listed on the NASDAQ Capital Market or NYSE American. By contrast, in some other countries—Australia, for example—nano-cap companies are commonly listed on the Australian Securities Exchange.

Microcap stocks are in many ways different from other stocks since they are from companies with a small market capitalization and are usually traded on stock exchanges that do not require minimum standards, such as a minimum amount of net assets or a minimum number of stock holders. In addition, these micro cap stock companies often have fewer resources to make their information available to the public. These micro cap stocks are less likely to be published and talked about by stockbrokers compared to larger public companies. Often, microcap stock companies will specialize in innovative products or services that may be unknown to the general public. In Australia, many of them are junior mining explorers.

Micro-cap and especially nano-cap stocks can sometimes experience volatility. Some of these companies fail to execute their business plans and go out of business. Fraud and market manipulation are not uncommon and the transaction costs in trading can be quite high. Pricing is more likely to be inefficient, since fewer institutional investors and analysts operate in this space, due to the relatively small dollar amounts involved and the lack of liquidity—in other words, how many trades are made per day.

Investors and finance experts have proposed microcaps can be good investments. David Maley of Ariel Investments argues that ample evidence indicates holding a portion of a portfolio in micro-cap stocks can offer advantages. Micro-caps as a group tend to out-perform stocks from larger companies over time, Daley notes, and micro-caps are not closely correlated with larger company stocks or index funds and thus potentially offset broader market volatility. Furthermore, micro-caps being relatively neglected by analysts offers more potential opportunities for value investors. Similarly, professor Jeremy J. Siegel of Wharton School of Business notes in his book Stocks for the Long Run how a review of American stock data from 1926 to 1996 found that the smallest quintile of stocks by capitalization (including micro-caps) outperformed the largest quintile by an average of almost 4% per year. But this over-performance was not consistent, with multi-year stretches of time when smaller company stocks under-performed relative to larger company stock.

== Risks and regulatory concerns ==
Microcap stocks are generally considered higher risk than larger-capitalization equities due to factors such as limited financial disclosure, thin trading volumes, and greater susceptibility to price manipulation. According to the U.S. Securities and Exchange Commission, microcap companies may have little or no proven track record, lack substantial assets or revenues, and often trade in low volumes, which can cause relatively small trades to have a large impact on price movements. Such characteristics can make it difficult for investors to sell shares when desired and contribute to price volatility.

US federal authorities also warn that fraud and market manipulation schemes, such as pump-and-dump promotions, have historically targeted microcap stocks because of the limited availability of reliable public information. In such schemes, prices can be artificially inflated through false or misleading statements before insiders sell their holdings, leaving other investors with losses.

== By country ==
=== Australia ===
The MSCI Australia Micro Cap Index is officially "designed to measure the performance of the micro cap segment of the Australian equity market". As of 30 September 2026, the index had 455 constituents, with market caps ranging from A$3.47 million to A$1.184 billion; the median market cap was A$107.02 million and the mean was A$178.61 million.

=== United Kingdom ===
In the UK, the FTSE Fledgling Index is one prominent microcap stock index. As of 29 May 2026, the FTSE Fledgling Index had 36 constituents, with their approximate market caps ranging from £1 million to £77 million; the median market cap was £17 million, and the mean was £22 million.

=== United States ===
As of 2022, FINRA's investor education materials state that microcaps are typically (not officially) defined as stocks with total market caps below $250 million (equivalent to $265.8 million in 2024 using GDP deflator adjustment). The U.S. Securities and Exchange Commission notes that nanocap stocks, in cases when they're separated from microcaps, are typically defined as stocks with a market capitalization less than $50 million (as of 2013); which is equivalent to less than $66 million in 2024.

Index provider Morningstar Indexes defines its US microcap segment as the bottom 2% of total US investable equity market capitalization. As of 30 September 2025, the Morningstar US Micro Cap Index contained 1,819 companies. As of Q2 2026, companies in the index had market caps below $2,984,336,260.

The Russell Microcap Index aims to have 2,000 holdings. However, due to US public company statistics during its most recent reconstitution, as of 31 August 2026, it actually had only 1,341 holdings. As of 31 August 2026, its holdings had a median market cap of $267 million and a mean of $889 million; its largest holding had a market cap of $3.42 billion.

S&P Dow Jones Indices offers two micro-cap indices:

Market cap statistics of Dow Jones microcap indices, as of September 30, 2026
Index	Constituents	Market capitalization of constituents (in US$ millions)				Source
Index	Constituents	Smallest	Median	Mean	Largest	Source
Dow Jones U.S. Micro-Cap Total Stock Market Index	1316	0.04	73.29	142.26	832.48	
Dow Jones Select Micro-Cap Index	135	167.74	499.45	510.46	1,164.56	

The Dow Jones U.S. Micro-Cap Total Stock Market Index "is designed to provide a comprehensive measure of the micro-cap segment of the US stock market", and consists of eligible stocks with market caps smaller than the largest 3000. The Dow Jones Select Micro-Cap Index consists of microcaps with relatively high liquidity and better fundamentals.

== See also ==
- Market manipulation
- Microcap stock fraud
- Penny stock
- Megacap stock
- Market capitalization § Market cap terms, including large-cap and mid-cap
- Small cap company
- List of public corporations by market capitalization
- Market price
- Authorised capital
- Treasury stock
