= List of Russell 1000 companies =

List of companies in the Russell 1000

The Russell 1000 is a stock market index maintained by FTSE Russell. It contains approximately 1,000 common stocks issued by companies with large or medium market capitalizations. It is weighted by free-float market capitalization and is reconstituted every June.

== Russell 1000 components ==
The following are the components of the index as of September 2026:

Company	Symbol	GICS Sector	GICS Sub-Industry
3M	MMM	Industrials	Industrial Conglomerates
A. O. Smith	AOS	Industrials	Building Products
AAON	AAON	Industrials	Building Products
Abbott Laboratories	ABT	Health Care	Health Care Equipment
AbbVie	ABBV	Health Care	Pharmaceuticals
Accenture	ACN	Information Technology	IT Consulting & Other Services
Acuity Brands	AYI	Industrials	Electrical Components & Equipment
Adobe Inc.	ADBE	Information Technology	Application Software
ADT Inc.	ADT	Consumer Discretionary	
Advanced Drainage Systems	WMS	Industrials	
Advanced Energy	AEIS	Information Technology	Semiconductor Materials & Equipment
Advanced Micro Devices	AMD	Information Technology	Semiconductors
AECOM	ACM	Industrials	Construction & Engineering
AeroVironment	AVAV	Industrials	Aerospace & Defense
AES Corporation	AES	Utilities	Independent Power Producers & Energy Traders
Affiliated Managers Group	AMG	Financials	Asset Management & Custody Banks
Affirm Holdings	AFRM	Information Technology	
Aflac	AFL	Financials	Life & Health Insurance
AGCO	AGCO	Industrials	Agricultural & Farm Machinery
Agilent Technologies	A	Health Care	Health Care Equipment
Agree Realty	ADC	Real Estate	
AGNC Investment	AGNC	Financials	
Air Products	APD	Materials	Industrial Gases
Airbnb	ABNB	Consumer Discretionary	Hotels, Resorts & Cruise lines
Akamai Technologies	AKAM	Information Technology	Internet Services & Infrastructure
Alaska Air Group	ALK	Industrials	Passenger Airlines
Albemarle Corporation	ALB	Materials	Specialty Chemicals
Albertsons	ACI	Consumer Staples	Food Retail
Alcoa	AA	Materials	Aluminum
Alexandria Real Estate Equities	ARE	Real Estate	Office REITs
Align Technology	ALGN	Health Care	Health Care Supplies
Allegion	ALLE	Industrials	Building Products
Allegro MicroSystems	ALGM	Information Technology	
Alliant Energy	LNT	Utilities	Electric Utilities
Allison Transmission	ALSN	Industrials	
Allstate	ALL	Financials	Property & Casualty Insurance
Ally Financial	ALLY	Financials	
Almonty Industries	ALM	Materials	Diversified Metals & Mining
Alnylam Pharmaceuticals	ALNY	Health Care	
Alphabet (Class A)	GOOGL	Communication Services	Interactive Media & Services
Alphabet (Class C)	GOOG	Communication Services	Interactive Media & Services
Altria	MO	Consumer Staples	Tobacco
Amazon	AMZN	Consumer Discretionary	Broadline Retail
Amcor	AMCR	Materials	Paper & Plastic Packaging Products & Materials
Amdocs	DOX	Information Technology	
Amentum	AMTM	Industrials	Diversified Support Services
Amer Sports	AS	Consumer Discretionary	Leisure Products
Ameren	AEE	Utilities	Multi-Utilities
American Airlines Group	AAL	Industrials	Passenger Airlines
American Electric Power	AEP	Utilities	Electric Utilities
American Express	AXP	Financials	Consumer Finance
American Financial Group	AFG	Financials	Multi-line Insurance
American Healthcare REIT	AHR	Real Estate	Health Care REITs
American Homes 4 Rent	AMH	Real Estate	
American International Group	AIG	Financials	Property & Casualty Insurance
American Tower	AMT	Real Estate	Telecom Tower REITs
American Water Works	AWK	Utilities	Water Utilities
Americold	COLD	Real Estate	
Ameriprise Financial	AMP	Financials	Asset Management & Custody Banks
Ametek	AME	Industrials	Electrical Components & Equipment
Amgen	AMGN	Health Care	Biotechnology
Amkor Technology	AMKR	Information Technology	Semiconductors
Amphenol	APH	Information Technology	Electronic Components
Analog Devices	ADI	Information Technology	Semiconductors
AngloGold Ashanti	AU	Materials	Gold
Annaly Capital Management	NLY	Financials	
Antero Midstream	AM	Energy	
Antero Resources	AR	Energy	
Aon plc	AON	Financials	Insurance Brokers
APA Corporation	APA	Energy	Oil & Gas Exploration & Production
APi Group	APG	Industrials	Construction & Engineering
Apollo Global Management	APO	Financials	Asset Management & Custody Banks
AppFolio	APPF	Information Technology	Application Software
Apple Inc.	AAPL	Information Technology	Technology Hardware, Storage & Peripherals
Applied Digital	APLD	Information Technology	Internet Services & Infrastructure
Applied Industrial Technologies	AIT	Industrials	Trading Companies & Distributors
Applied Materials	AMAT	Information Technology	Semiconductor Materials & Equipment
Applied Optoelectronics	AAOI	Information Technology	Semiconductors
AppLovin	APP	Information Technology	Application Software
AptarGroup	ATR	Materials	Metal, Glass & Plastic Containers
Aptiv	APTV	Consumer Discretionary	Automotive Parts & Equipment
Aramark	ARMK	Consumer Discretionary	
Arch Capital Group	ACGL	Financials	Reinsurance
Archer Daniels Midland	ADM	Consumer Staples	Agricultural Products & Services
Ares Management	ARES	Financials	
Arista Networks	ANET	Information Technology	Communications Equipment
Armstrong World Industries	AWI	Industrials	
Arrow Electronics	ARW	Information Technology	Technology Distributors
Arrowhead Pharmaceuticals	ARWR	Health Care	Biotechnology
Arthur J. Gallagher & Co.	AJG	Financials	Insurance Brokers
Ascendis Pharma	ASND	Health Care	Biotechnology
Assurant	AIZ	Financials	Multi-line Insurance
Assured Guaranty	AGO	Financials	
Astera Labs	ALAB	Information Technology	Semiconductors
AST SpaceMobile	ASTS	Communication Services	Wireless Telecommunication Services
AT&T	T	Communication Services	Integrated Telecommunication Services
ATI Inc.	ATI	Industrials	Aerospace & Defense
Atlassian	TEAM	Information Technology	Application Software
Atmos Energy	ATO	Utilities	Gas Utilities
Aura Minerals	AUGO	Materials	Gold
Aurora Innovation	AUR	Information Technology	
Autodesk	ADSK	Information Technology	Application Software
Automatic Data Processing	ADP	Industrials	Human Resource & Employment Services
AutoNation	AN	Consumer Discretionary	Automotive Retail
AutoZone	AZO	Consumer Discretionary	Automotive Retail
Avantor	AVTR	Health Care	
Avery Dennison	AVY	Materials	Paper & Plastic Packaging Products & Materials
Avis Budget Group	CAR	Industrials	Passenger Ground Transportation
Avnet	AVT	Information Technology	Technology Distributors
Axalta	AXTA	Materials	
AXIS Capital	AXS	Financials	
Axon Enterprise	AXON	Industrials	Aerospace & Defense
Axsome Therapeutics	AXSM	Health Care	Biotechnology
Baker Hughes	BKR	Energy	Oil & Gas Equipment & Services
Ball Corporation	BALL	Materials	Metal, Glass & Plastic Containers
Bank of America	BAC	Financials	Diversified Banks
Bank OZK	OZK	Financials	Regional Banks
Bath & Body Works, Inc.	BBWI	Consumer Discretionary	Other Specialty Retail
Baxter International	BAX	Health Care	Health Care Equipment
Becton Dickinson	BDX	Health Care	Health Care Equipment
Bentley Systems	BSY	Information Technology	
Berkshire Hathaway	BRK.B	Financials	Multi-Sector Holdings
Best Buy	BBY	Consumer Discretionary	Computer & Electronics Retail
Bill.com	BILL	Information Technology	
Bio-Rad Laboratories	BIO	Health Care	Life Sciences Tools & Services
Bio-Techne	TECH	Health Care	Life Sciences Tools & Services
Biogen	BIIB	Health Care	Biotechnology
BioMarin Pharmaceutical	BMRN	Health Care	
Birkenstock	BIRK	Consumer Discretionary	Footwear
Bitmine Immersion Technologies	BMNR	Information Technology	
BJ's Wholesale Club	BJ	Consumer Staples	Hypermarkets & Super Centers
BlackRock	BLK	Financials	Asset Management & Custody Banks
Blackstone Inc.	BX	Financials	Asset Management & Custody Banks
H&R Block	HRB	Consumer Discretionary	Specialized Consumer Services
Block, Inc.	XYZ	Financials	Transaction & Payment Processing Services
Bloom Energy	BE	Industrials	
Blue Owl Capital	OWL	Financials	
BNY Mellon	BNY	Financials	Asset Management & Custody Banks
Boeing	BA	Industrials	Aerospace & Defense
BOK Financial Corporation	BOKF	Financials	
Booking Holdings	BKNG	Consumer Discretionary	Hotels, Resorts & Cruise Lines
Booz Allen Hamilton	BAH	Industrials	
BorgWarner	BWA	Consumer Discretionary	Automotive Parts & Equipment
Boston Scientific	BSX	Health Care	Health Care Equipment
Boyd Gaming	BYD	Consumer Discretionary	Casinos & Gaming
BridgeBio Pharma	BBIO	Health Care	
Bright Horizons	BFAM	Consumer Discretionary	
Brighthouse Financial	BHF	Financials	Life & Health Insurance
Bristol Myers Squibb	BMY	Health Care	Health Care Distributors
Brixmor Property Group	BRX	Real Estate	Retail REITs
Broadcom	AVGO	Information Technology	Semiconductors
Broadridge Financial Solutions	BR	Industrials	Data Processing & Outsourced Services
Brookfield Asset Management	BAM	Financials	Asset Management & Custody Banks
Brookfield Renewable Partners	BEPC	Utilities	
Brown & Brown	BRO	Financials	Insurance Brokers
Brown–Forman (Class A)	BF.A	Consumer Staples	Distillers & Vintners
Brown–Forman (Class B)	BF.B	Consumer Staples	Distillers & Vintners
Bruker	BRKR	Health Care	Health Care Equipment
Brunswick Corporation	BC	Consumer Discretionary	Leisure Products
Builders FirstSource	BLDR	Industrials	Building Products
Bullish	BLSH	Financials	
Bunge Global	BG	Consumer Staples	Agricultural Products & Services
Burlington Stores	BURL	Consumer Discretionary	
BWX Technologies	BWXT	Industrials	
BXP, Inc.	BXP	Real Estate	Office REITs
C.H. Robinson	CHRW	Industrials	Air Freight & Logistics
CACI	CACI	Industrials	Diversified Support Services
Cadence Design Systems	CDNS	Information Technology	Application Software
Caesars Entertainment	CZR	Consumer Discretionary	Casinos & Gaming
Camden Property Trust	CPT	Real Estate	Multi-Family Residential REITs
Campbell's	CPB	Consumer Staples	Packaged Foods & Meats
Capital One	COF	Financials	Consumer Finance
Cardinal Health	CAH	Health Care	Health Care Distributors
Caris Life Sciences	CAI	Health Care	Biotechnology
Carlisle Companies	CSL	Industrials	Industrial Conglomerates
Carlyle Group (The)	CG	Financials	
CarMax	KMX	Consumer Discretionary	Automotive Retail
Carnival Corporation	CCL	Consumer Discretionary	Hotels, Resorts & Cruise Lines
Carpenter Technology Corporation	CRS	Materials	Steel
Carrier Global	CARR	Industrials	Building Products
Carvana	CVNA	Consumer Discretionary	Automotive Retail
Casey's	CASY	Consumer Staples	Food Retail
Caterpillar Inc.	CAT	Industrials	Construction Machinery & Heavy Transportation Equipment
Cava Group	CAVA	Consumer Discretionary	Restaurants
Cboe Global Markets	CBOE	Financials	Financial Exchanges & Data
CBRE Group	CBRE	Real Estate	Real Estate Services
CCC Intelligent Solutions	CCC	Information Technology	
CDW	CDW	Information Technology	Technology Distributors
Celanese	CE	Materials	Specialty Chemicals
Celsius Holdings	CELH	Consumer Staples	Soft Drinks & Non-alcoholic Beverages
Cencora	COR	Health Care	Health Care Distributors
Centene	CNC	Health Care	Managed Health Care
Centerpoint Energy	CNP	Utilities	Multi-Utilities
Central Bancompany	CBC	Financials	
CF Industries	CF	Materials	Fertilizers & Agricultural Chemicals
Charles River Laboratories	CRL	Health Care	Life Sciences Tools & Services
Charles Schwab Corporation	SCHW	Financials	Investment Banking & Brokerage
Charter Communications	CHTR	Communication Services	Cable & Satellite
Chemed Corporation	CHE	Health Care	Health Care Services
Cheniere Energy	LNG	Energy	
Chevron Corporation	CVX	Energy	Integrated Oil & Gas
Chewy	CHWY	Consumer Discretionary	Other Specialty Retail
Chime Financial	CHYM	Financials	
Chipotle Mexican Grill	CMG	Consumer Discretionary	Restaurants
Choice Hotels	CHH	Consumer Discretionary	Hotels, Resorts & Cruise Lines
Chord Energy	CHRD	Energy	Oil & Gas Exploration & Production
Chubb Limited	CB	Financials	Property & Casualty Insurance
Church & Dwight	CHD	Consumer Staples	Household Products
Churchill Downs Incorporated	CHDN	Consumer Discretionary	Casinos & Gaming
Ciena	CIEN	Information Technology	Communications Equipment
Cigna	CI	Health Care	Managed Health Care
Cincinnati Financial	CINF	Financials	Property & Casualty Insurance
Cintas	CTAS	Industrials	Diversified Support Services
Circle Internet Group	CRCL	Information Technology	
Cirrus Logic	CRUS	Information Technology	Semiconductors
Cisco	CSCO	Information Technology	Communications Equipment
Citigroup	C	Financials	Diversified Banks
Citizens Financial Group	CFG	Financials	Regional Banks
Clean Harbors	CLH	Industrials	Environmental & Facilities Services
Clearway Energy (Class C)	CWEN	Utilities	
Cleveland-Cliffs	CLF	Materials	Steel
Clorox	CLX	Consumer Staples	Household Products
Cloudflare	NET	Information Technology	
CME Group	CME	Financials	Financial Exchanges & Data
CMS Energy	CMS	Utilities	Multi-Utilities
CNA Financial	CNA	Financials	
CNH Industrial	CNH	Industrials	
Coca-Cola Company (The)	KO	Consumer Staples	Soft Drinks & Non-alcoholic Beverages
Coca-Cola Consolidated	COKE	Consumer Staples	Soft Drinks & Non-alcoholic Beverages
Coeur Mining	CDE	Materials	
Cognex Corporation	CGNX	Information Technology	Electronic Equipment & Instruments
Cognizant	CTSH	Information Technology	IT Consulting & Other Services
Coherent Corp.	COHR	Information Technology	Electronic Components
Coinbase	COIN	Financials	Financial Exchanges & Data
Colgate-Palmolive	CL	Consumer Staples	Household Products
Columbia Banking System	COLB	Financials	Regional Banks
Columbia Sportswear	COLM	Consumer Discretionary	Apparel, Accessories & Luxury Goods
Comcast	CMCSA	Communication Services	Cable & Satellite
Comfort Systems USA	FIX	Industrials	Construction & Engineering
Commerce Bancshares	CBSH	Financials	Regional Banks
Conagra Brands	CAG	Consumer Staples	Packaged Foods & Meats
ConocoPhillips	COP	Energy	Oil & Gas Exploration & Production
Consolidated Edison	ED	Utilities	Electric Utilities
Constellation Brands	STZ	Consumer Staples	Distillers & Vintners
Constellation Energy	CEG	Utilities	Multi-Utilities
Cooper Companies (The)	COO	Health Care	Health Care Supplies
Copart	CPRT	Industrials	Diversified Support Services
Corcept Therapeutics	CORT	Health Care	Pharmaceuticals
Core & Main	CNM	Industrials	Trading Companies & Distributors
Corebridge Financial	CRBG	Financials	
CoreWeave	CRWV	Information Technology	
Corning Inc.	GLW	Information Technology	Electronic Components
Corpay	CPAY	Financials	Transaction & Payment Processing Services
Corteva	CTVA	Materials	Fertilizers & Agricultural Chemicals
CoStar Group	CSGP	Real Estate	Real Estate Services
Costco	COST	Consumer Staples	Consumer Staples Merchandise Retail
Coupang	CPNG	Consumer Discretionary	
Cousins Properties	CUZ	Real Estate	Office REITs
Crane Co.	CR	Industrials	Industrial Machinery & Supplies & Components
Credit Acceptance	CACC	Financials	
Credo Technology Group	CRDO	Information Technology	
CRH plc	CRH	Materials	Construction Materials
Crocs	CROX	Consumer Discretionary	Footwear
CrowdStrike	CRWD	Information Technology	Application Software
Crown Castle	CCI	Real Estate	Telecom Tower REITs
Crown Holdings	CCK	Materials	
CSX Corporation	CSX	Industrials	Rail Transportation
CubeSmart	CUBE	Real Estate	
Cummins	CMI	Industrials	Industrial Machinery & Supplies & Components
Curtiss-Wright	CW	Industrials	Aerospace & Defense
CVS Health	CVS	Health Care	Health Care Services
D. R. Horton	DHI	Consumer Discretionary	Homebuilding
Danaher Corporation	DHR	Health Care	Life Sciences Tools & Services
Darden Restaurants	DRI	Consumer Discretionary	Restaurants
Darling Ingredients	DAR	Consumer Staples	
Datadog	DDOG	Information Technology	Application Software
DaVita	DVA	Health Care	Health Care Facilities
Deckers Brands	DECK	Consumer Discretionary	Footwear
Deere & Company	DE	Industrials	Agricultural & Farm Machinery
Delta Air Lines	DAL	Industrials	Passenger Airlines
Dell Technologies	DELL	Information Technology	Technology Hardware, Storage & Peripherals
Devon Energy	DVN	Energy	Oil & Gas Exploration & Production
Dexcom	DXCM	Health Care	Health Care Equipment
Diamondback Energy	FANG	Energy	Oil & Gas Exploration & Production
Dick's Sporting Goods	DKS	Consumer Discretionary	Other Specialty Retail
Digital Realty	DLR	Real Estate	Data Center REITs
DigitalOcean	DOCN	Information Technology	
Dillard's	DDS	Consumer Discretionary	Broadline Retail
DocuSign	DOCU	Information Technology	Application Software
Dolby Laboratories	DLB	Information Technology	
Dollar General	DG	Consumer Staples	Consumer Staples Merchandise Retail
Dollar Tree	DLTR	Consumer Staples	Consumer Staples Merchandise Retail
Dominion Energy	D	Utilities	Electric Utilities
Domino's	DPZ	Consumer Discretionary	Restaurants
Donaldson Company	DCI	Industrials	Industrial Machinery & Supplies & Components
DoorDash	DASH	Consumer Discretionary	Interactive Media & Services
Dover Corporation	DOV	Industrials	Industrial Machinery & Supplies & Components
Dow Inc.	DOW	Materials	Commodity Chemicals
Doximity	DOCS	Health Care	
DraftKings	DKNG	Consumer Discretionary	
Dropbox	DBX	Information Technology	
DT Midstream	DTM	Energy	
DTE Energy	DTE	Utilities	Multi-Utilities
Duke Energy	DUK	Utilities	Electric Utilities
Duolingo	DUOL	Consumer Discretionary	Education Services
DuPont	DD	Materials	Specialty Chemicals
Dutch Bros Inc.	BROS	Consumer Discretionary	Restaurants
Dycom Industries	DY	Industrials	
Dynatrace	DT	Information Technology	
e.l.f. Beauty	ELF	Consumer Staples	Personal Care Products
Eagle Materials	EXP	Materials	Construction Materials
East West Bancorp	EWBC	Financials	Regional Banks
EastGroup Properties	EGP	Real Estate	
Eastman Chemical Company	EMN	Materials	Diversified Chemicals
Eaton Corporation	ETN	Industrials	Electrical Components & Equipment
eBay	EBAY	Consumer Discretionary	Broadline Retail
EchoStar	ECHO	Communication Services	Wireless Telecommunication Services
Ecolab	ECL	Materials	Specialty Chemicals
Edison International	EIX	Utilities	Electric Utilities
Edwards Lifesciences	EW	Health Care	Health Care Equipment
Elanco	ELAN	Health Care	
Elastic NV	ESTC	Information Technology	
Element Solutions	ESI	Materials	
Elevance Health	ELV	Health Care	Managed Health Care
Emcor	EME	Industrials	Construction & Engineering
Emerson Electric	EMR	Industrials	Electrical Components & Equipment
Encompass Health	EHC	Health Care	Health Care Facilities
Enphase Energy	ENPH	Information Technology	Electronic Components
Ensign Group	ENSG	Health Care	
Entegris	ENTG	Information Technology	
Entergy	ETR	Utilities	Electric Utilities
Envista	NVST	Health Care	Health Care Supplies
EOG Resources	EOG	Energy	Oil & Gas Exploration & Production
EPAM Systems	EPAM	Information Technology	IT Consulting & Other Services
EPR Properties	EPR	Real Estate	Other Specialized REITs
EQT Corporation	EQT	Energy	Oil & Gas Exploration & Production
Equifax	EFX	Industrials	Research & Consulting Services
Equinix	EQIX	Real Estate	Data Center REITs
Equitable Holdings	EQH	Financials	
Equity Lifestyle Properties	ELS	Real Estate	
ESAB	ESAB	Industrials	Industrial Machinery & Supplies & Components
Essential Utilities	WTRG	Utilities	Water Utilities
Essex Property Trust	ESS	Real Estate	Multi-Family Residential REITs
Estée Lauder Companies (The)	EL	Consumer Staples	Personal Care Products
Etsy	ETSY	Consumer Discretionary	
Euronet Worldwide	EEFT	Financials	Transaction & Payment Processing Services
Evercore	EVR	Financials	Investment Banking & Brokerage
Everest Group	EG	Financials	Reinsurance
Evergy	EVRG	Utilities	Electric Utilities
Everpure	P	Information Technology	Technology Hardware, Storage & Peripherals
Eversource Energy	ES	Utilities	Multi-Utilities
Everus Construction Group	ECG	Industrials	Construction & Engineering
Exelixis	EXEL	Health Care	Biotechnology
Exelon	EXC	Utilities	Multi-Utilities
EXL Service	EXLS	Industrials	Data Processing & Outsourced Services
Expand Energy	EXE	Energy	Oil & Gas Exploration & Production
Expedia Group	EXPE	Consumer Discretionary	Hotels, Resorts & Cruise Lines
Expeditors International	EXPD	Industrials	Air Freight & Logistics
Extra Space Storage	EXR	Real Estate	Self-Storage REITs
ExxonMobil	XOM	Energy	Integrated Oil & Gas
F5, Inc.	FFIV	Information Technology	Communications Equipment
Fabrinet	FN	Information Technology	
FactSet	FDS	Financials	Financial Exchanges & Data
Fair Isaac	FICO	Information Technology	Application Software
Fastenal	FAST	Industrials	Building Products
Federal Realty Investment Trust	FRT	Real Estate	Retail REITs
FedEx	FDX	Industrials	Air Freight & Logistics
FedEx Freight	FDXF	Industrials	Cargo Ground Transportation
Ferguson Enterprises	FERG	Industrials	Industrial Machinery & Supplies & Components
Fermi Inc.	FRMI	Real Estate	
Fidelity National Financial	FNF	Financials	
Fidelity National Information Services	FIS	Financials	Transaction & Payment Processing Services
Fifth Third Bancorp	FITB	Financials	Regional Banks
Figma	FIG	Information Technology	
Figure Technology Solutions	FIGR	Financials	
First American Financial Corporation	FAF	Financials	Property & Casualty Insurance
First Citizens BancShares	FCNCA	Financials	
First Hawaiian, Inc.	FHB	Financials	Regional Banks
First Horizon Corporation	FHN	Financials	Regional Banks
First Industrial Realty Trust	FR	Real Estate	
First Solar	FSLR	Information Technology	Semiconductors
FirstEnergy	FE	Utilities	Electric Utilities
Fiserv	FISV	Financials	Transaction & Payment Processing Services
Five Below	FIVE	Consumer Discretionary	Other Specialty Retail
Flex Ltd.	FLEX	Information Technology	Electronic Manufacturing Services
Floor & Decor	FND	Consumer Discretionary	Home Improvement Retail
Flowserve	FLS	Industrials	Industrial Machinery & Supplies & Components
Flutter Entertainment	FLUT	Consumer Discretionary	Casinos & Gaming
FNB Corporation	FNB	Financials	Regional Banks
Ford Motor Company	F	Consumer Discretionary	Automobile Manufacturers
Forgent Power Solutions	FPS	Industrials	
FormFactor, Inc.	FORM	Information Technology	
Fortinet	FTNT	Information Technology	Systems Software
Fortive	FTV	Industrials	Industrial Machinery & Supplies & Components
Fortune Brands Innovations	FBIN	Industrials	Building Products
Fox Corporation (Class A)	FOXA	Communication Services	Movies & Entertainment
Fox Corporation (Class B)	FOX	Communication Services	Movies & Entertainment
Franklin Templeton Investments	BEN	Financials	Asset Management & Custody Banks
Freedom Holding	FRHC	Financials	
Freeport-McMoRan	FCX	Materials	Copper
Freshpet	FRPT	Consumer Staples	
Frost Bank	CFR	Financials	Regional Banks
FTAI Aviation	FTAI	Industrials	
FTI Consulting	FCN	Industrials	Research & Consulting Services
Galaxy Digital	GLXY	Financials	
GameStop	GME	Consumer Discretionary	Computer & Electronics Retail
Gaming and Leisure Properties	GLPI	Real Estate	
Gap Inc.	GAP	Consumer Discretionary	Apparel Retail
Garmin	GRMN	Consumer Discretionary	Consumer Electronics
Gartner	IT	Information Technology	IT Consulting & Other Services
Gates Corporation	GTES	Industrials	
GE Aerospace	GE	Industrials	Aerospace & Defense
GE HealthCare	GEHC	Health Care	Health Care Equipment
GE Vernova	GEV	Industrials	Industrial Machinery & Supplies & Components
Gen Digital	GEN	Information Technology	Application Software
Generac	GNRC	Industrials	Electrical Components & Equipment
General Dynamics	GD	Industrials	Aerospace & Defense
General Mills	GIS	Consumer Staples	Packaged Foods & Meats
General Motors	GM	Consumer Discretionary	Automobile Manufacturers
Genpact	G	Industrials	Data Processing & Outsourced Services
Gentex	GNTX	Consumer Discretionary	Automotive Parts & Equipment
Genuine Parts Company	GPC	Consumer Discretionary	Automotive Parts & Equipment
GFL Environmental	GFL	Industrials	
Gilead Sciences	GILD	Health Care	Biotechnology
GitLab	GTLB	Information Technology	
Global Payments	GPN	Financials	Transaction & Payment Processing Services
GlobalFoundries	GFS	Information Technology	
Globalstar	GSAT	Information Technology	
Globe Life	GL	Financials	Life & Health Insurance
Globus Medical	GMED	Health Care	Health Care Equipment
GoDaddy	GDDY	Information Technology	
Goldman Sachs	GS	Financials	Investment Banking & Brokerage
Graco Inc.	GGG	Industrials	Industrial Machinery & Supplies & Components
Grand Canyon Education	LOPE	Consumer Discretionary	Education Services
Graphic Packaging	GPK	Materials	
Guardant Health	GH	Health Care	
Guidewire Software	GWRE	Information Technology	
GXO Logistics	GXO	Industrials	Air Freight & Logistics
Halliburton	HAL	Energy	Oil & Gas Equipment & Services
Halozyme	HALO	Health Care	Biotechnology
Hamilton Lane	HLNE	Financials	
Hanover Insurance	THG	Financials	Property & Casualty Insurance
Hartford (The)	HIG	Financials	Property & Casualty Insurance
Hasbro	HAS	Consumer Discretionary	Leisure Products
Hayward Holdings	HAYW	Industrials	
HCA Healthcare	HCA	Health Care	Health Care Facilities
Healthcare Realty Trust	HR	Real Estate	
Healthpeak Properties	DOC	Real Estate	Health Care REITs
Hecla Mining	HL	Materials	
HEICO (Class A)	HEI.A	Industrials	Aerospace & Defense
HEICO (Common)	HEI	Industrials	Aerospace & Defense
Jack Henry & Associates	JKHY	Financials	Transaction & Payment Processing Services
Hershey Company (The)	HSY	Consumer Staples	Packaged Foods & Meats
Hewlett Packard Enterprise	HPE	Information Technology	Technology Hardware, Storage & Peripherals
Hexcel	HXL	Industrials	Aerospace & Defense
HF Sinclair	DINO	Energy	Oil & Gas Refining & Marketing
Hilton Worldwide	HLT	Consumer Discretionary	Hotels, Resorts & Cruise Lines
Home Depot (The)	HD	Consumer Discretionary	Home Improvement Retail
Honeywell Aerospace	HONA	Industrials	Aerospace & Defense
Honeywell Technologies	HON	Industrials	Industrial Conglomerates
Hormel Foods	HRL	Consumer Staples	Packaged Foods & Meats
Host Hotels & Resorts	HST	Real Estate	Hotel & Resort REITs
Houlihan Lokey	HLI	Financials	
Howard Hughes Holdings	HHH	Real Estate	
Howmet Aerospace	HWM	Industrials	Aerospace & Defense
HP Inc.	HPQ	Information Technology	Technology Hardware, Storage & Peripherals
Hubbell Incorporated	HUBB	Industrials	Industrial Machinery & Supplies & Components
HubSpot	HUBS	Information Technology	
Humana	HUM	Health Care	Managed Health Care
Huntington Bancshares	HBAN	Financials	Regional Banks
Huntington Ingalls Industries	HII	Industrials	Aerospace & Defense
Hyatt Hotels	H	Consumer Discretionary	
IBM	IBM	Information Technology	IT Consulting & Other Services
Idacorp	IDA	Utilities	Electric Utilities
IDEX Corporation	IEX	Industrials	Industrial Machinery & Supplies & Components
Idexx Laboratories	IDXX	Health Care	Health Care Equipment
IES Holdings	IESC	Industrials	
Illinois Tool Works	ITW	Industrials	Industrial Machinery & Supplies & Components
Illumina, Inc.	ILMN	Health Care	Life Sciences Tools & Services
Incyte	INCY	Health Care	Biotechnology
Ingersoll Rand	IR	Industrials	Industrial Machinery & Supplies & Components
Ingram Micro	INGM	Information Technology	Technology Distributors
Ingredion	INGR	Consumer Staples	Agricultural Products & Services
Insmed	INSM	Health Care	Biotechnology
Insulet	PODD	Health Care	
Intel	INTC	Information Technology	Semiconductors
Interactive Brokers	IBKR	Financials	Investment Banking & Brokerage
Intercontinental Exchange	ICE	Financials	Financial Exchanges & Data
International Flavors & Fragrances	IFF	Materials	Specialty Chemicals
International Paper	IP	Materials	Paper & Plastic Packaging Products & Materials
Intuit	INTU	Information Technology	Application Software
Intuitive Surgical	ISRG	Health Care	Health Care Equipment
Invesco	IVZ	Financials	Asset Management & Custody Banks
Invitation Homes	INVH	Real Estate	Single-Family Residential REITs
Ionis Pharmaceuticals	IONS	Health Care	
IonQ	IONQ	Information Technology	
IPG Photonics	IPGP	Information Technology	Electronic Manufacturing Services
IQVIA	IQV	Health Care	Life Sciences Tools & Services
IREN	IREN	Information Technology	
Iridium Communications	IRDM	Communication Services	
Iron Mountain	IRM	Real Estate	Other Specialized REITs
ITT Inc.	ITT	Industrials	Industrial Machinery & Supplies & Components
J. B. Hunt	JBHT	Industrials	Cargo Ground Transportation
Jabil	JBL	Information Technology	Electronic Manufacturing Services
Jacobs Solutions	J	Industrials	Construction & Engineering
James Hardie Industries	JHX	Materials	
Janus Living	JAN	Real Estate	Multi-Family Residential REITs
Jazz Pharmaceuticals	JAZZ	Health Care	Pharmaceuticals
JBS N.V.	JBS	Consumer Staples	
Jefferies Financial Group	JEF	Financials	Multi-Sector Holdings
Jersey Mike's Subs	JMKE	Consumer Discretionary	Restaurants
Johnson & Johnson	JNJ	Health Care	Pharmaceuticals
Johnson Controls	JCI	Industrials	Building Products
Jones Lang LaSalle	JLL	Real Estate	Real Estate Services
JPMorgan Chase	JPM	Financials	Diversified Banks
Karman Holdings	KRMN	Industrials	
KBR, Inc.	KBR	Industrials	Diversified Support Services
Kenvue	KVUE	Consumer Staples	Personal Care Products
Keurig Dr Pepper	KDP	Consumer Staples	Soft Drinks & Non-alcoholic Beverages
Keycorp	KEY	Financials	Regional Banks
Keysight	KEYS	Information Technology	Electronic Equipment & Instruments
Kilroy Realty	KRC	Real Estate	
Kimberly-Clark	KMB	Consumer Staples	Household Products
Kimco Realty	KIM	Real Estate	Retail REITs
Kinder Morgan	KMI	Energy	Oil & Gas Storage & Transportation
Kinsale Capital Group	KNSL	Financials	
Kirby Corporation	KEX	Industrials	Marine Transportation
KKR & Co. Inc.	KKR	Financials	Asset Management & Custody Banks
KLA Corporation	KLAC	Information Technology	Semiconductor Materials & Equipment
Klaviyo	KVYO	Information Technology	
Knight-Swift	KNX	Industrials	Cargo Ground Transportation
Kraft Heinz	KHC	Consumer Staples	Packaged Foods & Meats
Kratos Defense & Security Solutions	KTOS	Industrials	
Kroger	KR	Consumer Staples	Food Retail
Kyndryl	KD	Information Technology	IT Consulting & Other Services
L3Harris	LHX	Industrials	Aerospace & Defense
Labcorp	LH	Health Care	Health Care Services
Lam Research	LRCX	Information Technology	Semiconductor Materials & Equipment
Lamar Advertising	LAMR	Real Estate	Other Specialized REITs
Lamb Weston	LW	Consumer Staples	Packaged Foods & Meats
Landstar	LSTR	Industrials	Cargo Ground Transportation
Las Vegas Sands	LVS	Consumer Discretionary	Casinos & Gaming
Lattice Semiconductor	LSCC	Information Technology	Semiconductors
Lazard	LAZ	Financials	
Lear Corporation	LEA	Consumer Discretionary	Automotive Parts & Equipment
Leidos	LDOS	Industrials	Diversified Support Services
Lennar (Class A)	LEN	Consumer Discretionary	Homebuilding
Lennar (Class B)	LEN.B	Consumer Discretionary	Homebuilding
Lennox International	LII	Industrials	Building Products
Leonardo DRS	DRS	Industrials	Aerospace & Defense
Liberty Broadband (Series A)	LBRDA	Communication Services	
Liberty Broadband (Series C)	LBRDK	Communication Services	
Liberty Global (Series A)	LBTYA	Communication Services	Cable & Satellite
Liberty Global (Series C)	LBTYK	Communication Services	Cable & Satellite
Liberty Formula 1 (Series A)	FWONA	Communication Services	
Liberty Formula 1 (Series C)	FWONK	Communication Services	
Liberty Live (Series A)	LLYVA	Communication Services	
Liberty Live (Series C)	LLYVK	Communication Services	
Lilly (Eli)	LLY	Health Care	Pharmaceuticals
Lincoln Electric	LECO	Industrials	Industrial Machinery & Supplies & Components
Lincoln Financial	LNC	Financials	Multi-line Insurance
Linde plc	LIN	Materials	Industrial Gases
Lineage, Inc.	LINE	Real Estate	Industrial REITs
Lithia Motors	LAD	Consumer Discretionary	Automotive Retail
Littelfuse	LFUS	Information Technology	Electronic Components
Live Nation Entertainment	LYV	Communication Services	Movies & Entertainment
LKQ Corporation	LKQ	Consumer Discretionary	Distributors
Loar Holdings	LOAR	Industrials	Aerospace & Defense
Lockheed Martin	LMT	Industrials	Aerospace & Defense
Loews Corporation	L	Financials	Multi-line Insurance
Louisiana-Pacific	LPX	Materials	Forest Products
Lowe's	LOW	Consumer Discretionary	Home Improvement Retail
LPL Financial	LPLA	Financials	
Lululemon Athletica	LULU	Consumer Discretionary	Apparel, Accessories & Luxury Goods
Lumentum	LITE	Information Technology	
Lyft	LYFT	Industrials	Passenger Ground Transportation
LyondellBasell	LYB	Materials	Specialty Chemicals
M&T Bank	MTB	Financials	Regional Banks
MACOM Technology Solutions	MTSI	Information Technology	Semiconductors
Macy's, Inc.	M	Consumer Discretionary	Department Stores
Madison Square Garden Sports	MSGS	Communication Services	
Madrigal Pharmaceuticals	MDGL	Health Care	
Manhattan Associates	MANH	Information Technology	
Maplebear Inc.	CART	Consumer Staples	Food Retail
Marathon Petroleum	MPC	Energy	Oil & Gas Refining & Marketing
Markel	MKL	Financials	
MarketAxess	MKTX	Financials	Financial Exchanges & Data
Marriott International	MAR	Consumer Discretionary	Hotels, Resorts & Cruise Lines
Marsh McLennan	MRSH	Financials	Insurance Brokers
Martin Marietta Materials	MLM	Materials	Construction Materials
Marvell Technology	MRVL	Information Technology	Semiconductors
Masco	MAS	Industrials	Building Products
MasTec	MTZ	Industrials	Construction & Engineering
Mastercard	MA	Financials	Transaction & Payment Processing Services
Matador Resources	MTDR	Energy	Oil & Gas Exploration & Production
Match Group	MTCH	Communication Services	Interactive Media & Services
Mattel	MAT	Consumer Discretionary	Leisure Products
McCormick & Company	MKC	Consumer Staples	Packaged Foods & Meats
McDonald's	MCD	Consumer Discretionary	Restaurants
McKesson	MCK	Health Care	Health Care Distributors
MDU Resources	MDU	Utilities	Multi-Utilities
Medical Properties Trust	MPT	Real Estate	Health Care REITs
Medline Inc.	MDLN	Health Care	
Medpace	MEDP	Health Care	
Medtronic	MDT	Health Care	Health Care Equipment
Merck & Co.	MRK	Health Care	Pharmaceuticals
Meta Platforms	META	Communication Services	Interactive Media & Services
Metlife	MET	Financials	Life & Health Insurance
Mettler Toledo	MTD	Health Care	Life Sciences Tools & Services
MGIC Investment Corporation	MTG	Financials	Reinsurance
MGM Resorts International	MGM	Consumer Discretionary	Casinos & Gaming
Microchip Technology	MCHP	Information Technology	Semiconductors
Micron Technology	MU	Information Technology	Semiconductors
Microsoft	MSFT	Information Technology	Systems Software
MicroStrategy	MSTR	Information Technology	Application Software
Mid-America Apartment Communities	MAA	Real Estate	Multi-Family Residential REITs
Midera Food Processing	MFP	Industrials	
Middleby	MIDD	Industrials	Industrial Machinery & Supplies & Components
Millicom	TIGO	Communication Services	Integrated Telecommunication Services
Millrose Properties	MRP	Consumer Discretionary	Homebuilding
MKS Instruments	MKSI	Information Technology	Semiconductor Materials & Equipment
Mobility Global	MBGL	Industrials	
Moderna	MRNA	Health Care	Biotechnology
Modine Manufacturing	MOD	Industrials	
Mohawk Industries	MHK	Consumer Discretionary	Home Furnishings
Molina Healthcare	MOH	Health Care	Managed Health Care
Molson Coors	TAP	Consumer Staples	Brewers
Mondelez International	MDLZ	Consumer Staples	Packaged Foods & Meats
MongoDB Inc.	MDB	Information Technology	Systems Software
Monolithic Power Systems	MPWR	Information Technology	Semiconductors
Monster Beverage	MNST	Consumer Staples	Soft Drinks & Non-alcoholic Beverages
Moody's Corporation	MCO	Financials	Financial Exchanges & Data
Morgan Stanley	MS	Financials	Investment Banking & Brokerage
Morningstar, Inc.	MORN	Financials	
Mosaic Company (The)	MOS	Materials	Fertilizers & Agricultural Chemicals
Motorola Solutions	MSI	Information Technology	Communications Equipment
MP Materials	MP	Materials	Diversified Metals & Mining
MSA Safety	MSA	Industrials	Office Services & Supplies
MSC Industrial Direct	MSM	Industrials	Trading Companies & Distributors
MSCI	MSCI	Financials	Financial Exchanges & Data
Mueller Industries	MLI	Industrials	Industrial Machinery & Supplies & Components
Murphy USA	MUSA	Consumer Discretionary	
Nasdaq, Inc.	NDAQ	Financials	Financial Exchanges & Data
Natera	NTRA	Health Care	
National Fuel Gas	NFG	Utilities	Gas Utilities
Netapp	NTAP	Information Technology	Technology Hardware, Storage & Peripherals
Netflix, Inc.	NFLX	Communication Services	Movies & Entertainment
Neurocrine Biosciences	NBIX	Health Care	Biotechnology
New York Times Company	NYT	Communication Services	Publishing
NewMarket	NEU	Materials	Specialty Chemicals
Newmont	NEM	Materials	Gold
News Corp (Class A)	NWSA	Communication Services	Publishing
News Corp (Class B)	NWS	Communication Services	Publishing
Nexstar Media Group	NXST	Communication Services	
NextEra Energy	NEE	Utilities	Multi-Utilities
Nextpower	NXT	Industrials	
NIQ Global Intelligence	NIQ	Communication Services	
Nike, Inc.	NKE	Consumer Discretionary	Apparel, Accessories & Luxury Goods
NiSource	NI	Utilities	Multi-Utilities
NNN Reit	NNN	Real Estate	Retail REITs
Nordson	NDSN	Industrials	Industrial Machinery & Supplies & Components
Norfolk Southern	NSC	Industrials	Rail Transportation
Northern Trust	NTRS	Financials	Asset Management & Custody Banks
Northrop Grumman	NOC	Industrials	Aerospace & Defense
Norwegian Cruise Line Holdings	NCLH	Consumer Discretionary	Hotels, Resorts & Cruise Lines
NOV Inc.	NOV	Energy	Oil & Gas Equipment & Services
NRG Energy	NRG	Utilities	Independent Power Producers & Energy Traders
Nubank	NU	Financials	
Nucor	NUE	Materials	Steel
Nutanix	NTNX	Information Technology	
nVent Electric	NVT	Industrials	
Nvidia	NVDA	Information Technology	Semiconductors
NVR, Inc.	NVR	Consumer Discretionary	Homebuilding
O'Reilly Auto Parts	ORLY	Consumer Discretionary	Automotive Retail
Occidental Petroleum	OXY	Energy	Oil & Gas Exploration & Production
OGE Energy	OGE	Utilities	Multi-Utilities
Oklo Inc.	OKLO	Utilities	
Okta, Inc.	OKTA	Information Technology	Application Software
Old Dominion Freight Line	ODFL	Industrials	Cargo Ground Transportation
Old Republic International	ORI	Financials	Property & Casualty Insurance
Olin Corporation	OLN	Materials	Diversified Chemicals
Ollie's Bargain Outlet	OLLI	Consumer Discretionary	General Merchandise Stores
Omega Healthcare Investors	OHI	Real Estate	
Omnicom Group	OMC	Communication Services	Advertising
On Holding AG	ONON	Consumer Discretionary	Footwear
ON Semiconductor	ON	Information Technology	Semiconductors
OneMain Financial	OMF	Financials	
Oneok	OKE	Energy	Oil & Gas Storage & Transportation
Onto Innovation	ONTO	Information Technology	Semiconductor Materials & Equipment
Oracle Corporation	ORCL	Information Technology	Application Software
Organon & Co.	OGN	Health Care	Pharmaceuticals
Oshkosh Corporation	OSK	Industrials	Construction Machinery & Heavy Transportation Equipment
Otis Worldwide	OTIS	Industrials	Industrial Machinery & Supplies & Components
Ovintiv	OVV	Energy	
Owens Corning	OC	Industrials	Building Products
Paccar	PCAR	Industrials	Construction Machinery & Heavy Transportation Equipment
Packaging Corporation of America	PKG	Materials	Paper & Plastic Packaging Products & Materials
Palantir Technologies	PLTR	Information Technology	Internet Services & Infrastructure
Palo Alto Networks	PANW	Information Technology	Systems Software
Parker Hannifin	PH	Industrials	Industrial Machinery & Supplies & Components
Parsons Corporation	PSN	Industrials	Aerospace & Defense
Paychex	PAYX	Industrials	Human Resource & Employment Services
Paycom	PAYC	Information Technology	Application Software
Paylocity	PCTY	Information Technology	Application Software
PayPal	PYPL	Financials	Transaction & Payment Processing Services
Pegasystems	PEGA	Information Technology	
Penske Automotive Group	PAG	Consumer Discretionary	
Pentair	PNR	Industrials	Industrial Machinery & Supplies & Components
Penumbra, Inc.	PEN	Health Care	Health Care Equipment
People Inc.	PPLI	Communication Services	
PepsiCo	PEP	Consumer Staples	Soft Drinks & Non-alcoholic Beverages
Performance Food Group	PFGC	Consumer Staples	Food Distributors
Permian Resources	PR	Energy	Oil & Gas Exploration & Production
Pfizer	PFE	Health Care	Pharmaceuticals
PG&E Corporation	PCG	Utilities	
Philip Morris International	PM	Consumer Staples	Tobacco
Phillips 66	PSX	Energy	Oil & Gas Refining & Marketing
Pilgrim's Pride	PPC	Consumer Staples	Packaged Foods & Meats
Pinnacle Financial Partners	PNFP	Financials	Regional Banks
Pinnacle West Capital	PNW	Utilities	Multi-Utilities
Pinterest	PINS	Communication Services	
Planet Fitness	PLNT	Consumer Discretionary	
Planet Labs	PL	Industrials	
PNC Financial Services	PNC	Financials	Regional Banks
Pool Corporation	POOL	Consumer Discretionary	Distributors
Popular, Inc.	BPOP	Financials	
Post Holdings	POST	Consumer Staples	Packaged Foods & Meats
Powell Industries	POWL	Industrials	
PPG Industries	PPG	Materials	Specialty Chemicals
PPL Corporation	PPL	Utilities	Electric Utilities
T. Rowe Price	TROW	Financials	Asset Management & Custody Banks
Primerica	PRI	Financials	Life & Health Insurance
Primo Brands	PRMB	Consumer Staples	Soft Drinks & Non-alcoholic Beverages
Primoris Services Corporation	PRIM	Industrials	
Principal Financial Group	PFG	Financials	Life & Health Insurance
Procore	PCOR	Information Technology	
Procter & Gamble	PG	Consumer Staples	Personal Care Products
Progressive Corporation	PGR	Financials	Property & Casualty Insurance
Prologis	PLD	Real Estate	Industrial REITs
Prosperity Bancshares	PB	Financials	Regional Banks
Prudential Financial	PRU	Financials	Life & Health Insurance
PTC Inc.	PTC	Information Technology	Application Software
Public Service Enterprise Group	PEG	Utilities	Electric Utilities
Public Storage	PSA	Real Estate	Self-Storage REITs
PulteGroup	PHM	Consumer Discretionary	Homebuilding
PVH Corp.	PVH	Consumer Discretionary	Apparel, Accessories & Luxury Goods
Qiagen	QGEN	Health Care	
Qnity Electronics	Q	Information Technology	Semiconductor Materials & Equipment
Qorvo	QRVO	Information Technology	Semiconductors
Qualcomm	QCOM	Information Technology	Semiconductors
Quanta Services	PWR	Industrials	Construction & Engineering
QuantumScape	QS	Consumer Discretionary	
Quest Diagnostics	DGX	Health Care	Health Care Services
QXO, Inc.	QXO	Industrials	
Ralliant	RAL	Information Technology	
Ralph Lauren Corporation	RL	Consumer Discretionary	Apparel, Accessories & Luxury Goods
Rambus	RMBS	Information Technology	
Range Resources	RRC	Energy	Oil & Gas Exploration & Production
Raymond James Financial	RJF	Financials	Investment Banking & Brokerage
Rayonier	RYN	Real Estate	Timber REITs
RB Global	RBA	Industrials	
RBC Bearings	RBC	Industrials	
Realty Income	O	Real Estate	Retail REITs
Reddit	RDDT	Communication Services	Interactive Media & Services
Regal Rexnord	RRX	Industrials	Electrical Components & Equipment
Regency Centers	REG	Real Estate	Retail REITs
Regeneron Pharmaceuticals	REGN	Health Care	Biotechnology
Regions Financial Corporation	RF	Financials	Regional Banks
Reinsurance Group of America	RGA	Financials	Reinsurance
Reliance, Inc.	RS	Materials	Steel
RenaissanceRe	RNR	Financials	Reinsurance
Repligen	RGEN	Health Care	Biotechnology
Republic Services	RSG	Industrials	Environmental & Facilities Services
Resmed	RMD	Health Care	Health Care Equipment
Restaurant Brands International	QSR	Consumer Discretionary	Restaurants
Revolution Medicines	RVMD	Health Care	
Revvity	RVTY	Health Care	Health Care Equipment
Rexford Industrial	REXR	Real Estate	
Reynolds Consumer Products	REYN	Consumer Staples	
RingCentral	RNG	Information Technology	
Rithm Capital	RITM	Financials	
Rivian	RIVN	Consumer Discretionary	
RLI Corp.	RLI	Financials	
Robert Half	RHI	Industrials	Human Resource & Employment Services
Robinhood Markets	HOOD	Financials	Investment Banking & Brokerage
Roblox Corporation	RBLX	Communication Services	
Rocket Companies	RKT	Financials	
Rocket Lab	RKLB	Industrials	Aerospace & Defense
Rockwell Automation	ROK	Industrials	Electrical Components & Equipment
Roivant Sciences	ROIV	Health Care	
Rollins, Inc.	ROL	Industrials	Environmental & Facilities Services
Roper Technologies	ROP	Industrials	Industrial Conglomerates
Ross Stores	ROST	Consumer Discretionary	Apparel Retail
Royal Caribbean Group	RCL	Consumer Discretionary	Hotels, Resorts & Cruise Lines
Royal Gold	RGLD	Materials	Precious Metals & Minerals
Royalty Pharma	RPRX	Health Care	
RPM International	RPM	Materials	Specialty Chemicals
RTX Corporation	RTX	Industrials	Aerospace & Defense
Rubrik	RBRK	Information Technology	
Ryan Specialty	RYAN	Financials	
Ryder	R	Industrials	Cargo Ground Transportation
S&P Global	SPGI	Financials	Financial Exchanges & Data
Saia	SAIA	Industrials	
SailPoint	SAIL	Information Technology	Application Software
Sanmina Corporation	SANM	Information Technology	
SAIC	SAIC	Industrials	Diversified Support Services
Salesforce	CRM	Information Technology	Application Software
Sallie Mae	SLM	Financials	Consumer Finance
Samsara	IOT	Information Technology	Systems Software
SanDisk	SNDK	Information Technology	Technology Hardware, Storage & Peripherals
SBA Communications	SBAC	Real Estate	Telecom Tower REITs
Schein (Henry)	HSIC	Health Care	Health Care Distributors
Schlumberger	SLB	Energy	Oil & Gas Equipment & Services
Schneider National	SNDR	Industrials	
Scotts Miracle-Gro Company	SMG	Materials	Fertilizers & Agricultural Chemicals
Seaboard Corporation	SEB	Consumer Staples	
SEI Investments Company	SEIC	Financials	Asset Management & Custody Banks
Sempra	SRE	Utilities	Multi-Utilities
Semtech	SMTC	Information Technology	
Sensata Technologies	ST	Industrials	
SentinelOne	S	Information Technology	
Service Corporation International	SCI	Consumer Discretionary	Specialized Consumer Services
ServiceNow	NOW	Information Technology	Systems Software
SharkNinja	SN	Consumer Discretionary	Household Appliances
Sherwin-Williams	SHW	Materials	Specialty Chemicals
Shift4	FOUR	Information Technology	
Silgan Holdings	SLGN	Materials	Metal, Glass & Plastic Containers
Simon Property Group	SPG	Real Estate	Retail REITs
Simpson Manufacturing Company	SSD	Industrials	Building Products
SiriusXM	SIRI	Communication Services	Broadcasting
SiteOne Landscape Supply	SITE	Industrials	
SiTime	SITM	Information Technology	
Skyworks Solutions	SWKS	Information Technology	Semiconductors
Smithfield Foods	SFD	Consumer Staples	Packaged Foods & Meats
J.M. Smucker Company (The)	SJM	Consumer Staples	Packaged Foods & Meats
Smurfit Westrock	SW	Materials	Paper & Plastic Packaging Products & Materials
Snap-on	SNA	Industrials	Industrial Machinery & Supplies & Components
Snowflake Inc.	SNOW	Information Technology	
SoFi	SOFI	Financials	
Solstice Advanced Materials	SOLS	Materials	
SOLV Energy	MWH	Industrials	Heavy Electrical Equipment
Solventum	SOLV	Health Care	Health Care Equipment
Somnigroup International	SGI	Consumer Discretionary	Home Furnishings
Sonoco	SON	Materials	Paper & Plastic Packaging Products & Materials
Sotera Health	SHC	Health Care	
Southern Company	SO	Utilities	Electric Utilities
Southern Copper	SCCO	Materials	
SouthState Corporation	SSB	Financials	Regional Banks
Southwest Airlines	LUV	Industrials	Passenger Airlines
SpaceX	SPCX	Communication Services	Wireless Telecommunication Services
Spotify	SPOT	Communication Services	Movies & Entertainment
Sprouts Farmers Market	SFM	Consumer Staples	Food Retail
SPX Technologies	SPXC	Industrials	
SS&C Technologies	SSNC	Information Technology	
STAG Industrial	STAG	Real Estate	
StandardAero	SARO	Industrials	Aerospace & Defense
Stanley Black & Decker	SWK	Industrials	Industrial Machinery & Supplies & Components
Starbucks	SBUX	Consumer Discretionary	Restaurants
Starwood Property Trust	STWD	Financials	
State Street Corporation	STT	Financials	Asset Management & Custody Banks
Steel Dynamics	STLD	Materials	Steel
Steris	STE	Health Care	Health Care Equipment
Sterling Infrastructure	STRL	Industrials	
Stifel	SF	Financials	Investment Banking & Brokerage
Stryker Corporation	SYK	Health Care	Health Care Equipment
Summit Therapeutics	SMMT	Health Care	
Sun Communities	SUI	Real Estate	
Sunbelt Rentals	SUNB	Industrials	
Supermicro	SMCI	Information Technology	Technology Hardware, Storage & Peripherals
Synchrony Financial	SYF	Financials	Consumer Finance
Synopsys	SNPS	Information Technology	Application Software
Sysco	SYY	Consumer Staples	Food Distributors
T-Mobile US	TMUS	Communication Services	Wireless Telecommunication Services
Take-Two Interactive	TTWO	Communication Services	Interactive Home Entertainment
Talen Energy	TLN	Utilities	Independent Power Producers & Energy Traders
Tapestry, Inc.	TPR	Consumer Discretionary	Apparel, Accessories & Luxury Goods
Targa Resources	TRGP	Energy	Oil & Gas Storage & Transportation
Target Corporation	TGT	Consumer Staples	Consumer Staples Merchandise Retail
TD Synnex	SNX	Information Technology	Technology Distributors
TechnipFMC	FTI	Energy	Oil & Gas Equipment & Services
Teledyne Technologies	TDY	Industrials	Aerospace & Defense
Teleflex	TFX	Health Care	Health Care Equipment
Tempus AI	TEM	Health Care	
Tenet Healthcare	THC	Health Care	Health Care Facilities
Teradyne	TER	Information Technology	Semiconductor Materials & Equipment
TeraWulf	WULF	Information Technology	
Tesla, Inc.	TSLA	Consumer Discretionary	Automobile Manufacturers
Tetra Tech	TTEK	Industrials	Environmental & Facilities Services
Texas Instruments	TXN	Information Technology	Semiconductors
Texas Pacific Land Corporation	TPL	Energy	Oil & Gas Exploration & Production
Texas Roadhouse	TXRH	Consumer Discretionary	
Textron	TXT	Industrials	Aerospace & Defense
Thermo Fisher Scientific	TMO	Health Care	Life Sciences Tools & Services
Third Federal S&L	TFSL	Financials	
Thor Industries	THO	Consumer Discretionary	Leisure Products
Timken Company	TKR	Industrials	Industrial Machinery & Supplies & Components
TJX Companies	TJX	Consumer Discretionary	Apparel Retail
TKO Group Holdings	TKO	Communication Services	Movies & Entertainment
Toast, Inc.	TOST	Information Technology	Transaction & Payment Processing Services
Toll Brothers	TOL	Consumer Discretionary	Homebuilding
Toro Company (The)	TTC	Industrials	Agricultural & Farm Machinery
TPG Inc.	TPG	Financials	
Tractor Supply Company	TSCO	Consumer Discretionary	Other Specialty Retail
Trade Desk (The)	TTD	Communication Services	Advertising
Tradeweb	TW	Financials	
Trane Technologies	TT	Industrials	Building Products
TransDigm Group	TDG	Industrials	Aerospace & Defense
TransUnion	TRU	Industrials	
Travel + Leisure Co.	TNL	Consumer Discretionary	Hotels, Resorts & Cruise Lines
Travelers Companies (The)	TRV	Financials	Property & Casualty Insurance
Trex Company, Inc.	TREX	Industrials	Building Products
Trimble Inc.	TRMB	Information Technology	Electronic Equipment & Instruments
Truist Financial	TFC	Financials	Regional Banks
TTM Technologies	TTMI	Information Technology	
Twilio	TWLO	Information Technology	
Tyler Technologies	TYL	Information Technology	Application Software
Tyson Foods	TSN	Consumer Staples	Packaged Foods & Meats
U-Haul	UHAL	Industrials	
U-Haul (Series N)	UHAL.B	Industrials	
U.S. Bancorp	USB	Financials	Diversified Banks
Uber	UBER	Industrials	Passenger Ground Transportation
Ubiquiti	UI	Information Technology	
UDR, Inc.	UDR	Real Estate	Multi-Family Residential REITs
UGI Corporation	UGI	Utilities	Gas Utilities
UiPath	PATH	Information Technology	
UL Solutions	ULS	Industrials	
Ulta Beauty	ULTA	Consumer Discretionary	Other Specialty Retail
Union Pacific Corporation	UNP	Industrials	Rail Transportation
United Airlines Holdings	UAL	Industrials	Passenger Airlines
United Parcel Service	UPS	Industrials	Air Freight & Logistics
United Rentals	URI	Industrials	Trading Companies & Distributors
United Therapeutics	UTHR	Health Care	Biotechnology
United Wholesale Mortgage	UWMC	Financials	
UnitedHealth Group	UNH	Health Care	Managed Health Care
Unity Technologies	U	Information Technology	
Universal Display Corporation	OLED	Information Technology	Semiconductors
Universal Health Services	UHS	Health Care	Health Care Facilities
Unum	UNM	Financials	Life & Health Insurance
US Foods	USFD	Consumer Staples	
Vail Resorts	MTN	Consumer Discretionary	
Valero Energy	VLO	Energy	Oil & Gas Refining & Marketing
Valmont Industries	VMI	Industrials	Industrial Machinery & Supplies & Components
Valvoline	VVV	Materials	Commodity Chemicals
Veeva Systems	VEEV	Health Care	
Ventas, Inc.	VTR	Real Estate	Health Care REITs
Veralto	VLTO	Industrials	Environmental & Facilities Services
Verisign	VRSN	Information Technology	Internet Services & Infrastructure
Verisk Analytics	VRSK	Industrials	Research & Consulting Services
Verizon	VZ	Communication Services	Integrated Telecommunication Services
Versant	VSNT	Communication Services	
Vertex Pharmaceuticals	VRTX	Health Care	Biotechnology
Vertiv	VRT	Industrials	
VF Corporation	VFC	Consumer Discretionary	Apparel, Accessories & Luxury Goods
Viatris	VTRS	Health Care	Pharmaceuticals
Viavi Solutions	VIAV	Information Technology	
Vici Properties	VICI	Real Estate	Hotel & Resort REITs
Vicor Corporation	VICR	Industrials	
Viking Holdings	VIK	Consumer Discretionary	Hotels, Resorts & Cruise Lines
Viking Therapeutics	VKTX	Health Care	Biotechnology
Viper Energy	VNOM	Energy	Oil & Gas Storage & Transportation
Virtu Financial	VIRT	Financials	
Visa Inc.	V	Financials	Transaction & Payment Processing Services
Vistra Corp.	VST	Utilities	Electric Utilities
Vivmark Residential	VMRK	Real Estate	Multi-Family Residential REITs
Vontier	VNT	Information Technology	Electronic Equipment & Instruments
Vornado Realty Trust	VNO	Real Estate	Office REITs
Voya Financial	VOYA	Financials	Multi-Sector Holdings
Vulcan Materials	VMC	Materials	Construction Materials
W. P. Carey	WPC	Real Estate	
W. R. Berkley Corporation	WRB	Financials	Property & Casualty Insurance
W. W. Grainger	GWW	Industrials	Industrial Machinery & Supplies & Components
Wabtec	WAB	Industrials	Construction Machinery & Heavy Transportation Equipment
Walmart	WMT	Consumer Staples	Consumer Staples Merchandise Retail
Walt Disney Company (The)	DIS	Communication Services	Movies & Entertainment
Waste Management, Inc.	WM	Industrials	Environmental & Facilities Services
Waters Corporation	WAT	Health Care	Health Care Distributors
Watsco	WSO	Industrials	Trading Companies & Distributors
Watts Water Technologies	WTS	Industrials	
Wayfair	W	Consumer Discretionary	
Weatherford International	WFRD	Energy	Oil & Gas Equipment & Services
Webster Bank	WBS	Financials	Regional Banks
WEC Energy Group	WEC	Utilities	Electric Utilities
Wells Fargo	WFC	Financials	Diversified Banks
Welltower	WELL	Real Estate	Health Care REITs
Wesco International	WCC	Industrials	
West Pharmaceutical Services	WST	Health Care	Health Care Supplies
Western Alliance Bancorporation	WAL	Financials	
Western Digital	WDC	Information Technology	Technology Hardware, Storage & Peripherals
Western Union	WU	Information Technology	Data Processing & Outsourced Services
Westlake Corporation	WLK	Materials	
WEX Inc.	WEX	Financials	Transaction & Payment Processing Services
Weyerhaeuser	WY	Real Estate	Timber REITs
Whirlpool Corporation	WHR	Consumer Discretionary	Household Appliances
White Mountains Insurance Group	WTM	Financials	
Williams Companies	WMB	Energy	Oil & Gas Storage & Transportation
Williams-Sonoma, Inc.	WSM	Consumer Discretionary	Homefurnishing Retail
Willis Towers Watson	WTW	Financials	Insurance Brokers
WillScot Mobile Mini	WSC	Industrials	
Wingstop	WING	Consumer Discretionary	
Wintrust Financial	WTFC	Financials	Regional Banks
Woodward, Inc.	WWD	Industrials	Electrical Components & Equipment
Workday, Inc.	WDAY	Information Technology	Application Software
Wyndham Hotels & Resorts	WH	Consumer Discretionary	Hotels, Resorts & Cruise Lines
Wynn Resorts	WYNN	Consumer Discretionary	Casinos & Gaming
X-energy	XE	Industrials	Heavy Electrical Equipment
Xcel Energy	XEL	Utilities	Multi-Utilities
XP Inc.	XP	Financials	Investment Banking & Brokerage
XPO, Inc.	XPO	Industrials	Cargo Ground Transportation
Xylem Inc.	XYL	Industrials	Industrial Machinery & Supplies & Components
Yeti Holdings	YETI	Consumer Discretionary	Leisure Products
Yum! Brands	YUM	Consumer Discretionary	Restaurants
Zebra Technologies	ZBRA	Information Technology	Electronic Equipment & Instruments
Zillow (Class A)	ZG	Real Estate	
Zillow (Class C)	Z	Real Estate	
Zimmer Biomet	ZBH	Health Care	Health Care Equipment
Zions Bancorporation	ZION	Financials	Regional Banks
Zoetis	ZTS	Health Care	Pharmaceuticals
Zoom Communications	ZM	Information Technology	Application Software
ZoomInfo	GTM	Communication Services	
Zscaler	ZS	Information Technology	Application Software
