= Freshpet =

American pet food company

Freshpet, Inc.
- Type: Public
- Traded as: Nasdaq: FRPT; Russell 1000 component; S&P 600 component
- Industry: Pet food
- Founded: 2006; 20 years ago
- Headquarters: Bedminster, New Jersey, U.S.
- Key people: Billy Cyr (CEO)
- Products: Refrigerated pet food
- Revenue: ▲US$318.79 million (2020)
- Net income: US$139.14 million (2025)
- Number of employees: 591
- Website: freshpet.com

Freshpet, Inc. is an American pet food company. Its cat food and dog food products are marketed as fresh and need to be kept refrigerated. It is listed on the Nasdaq exchange with the ticker symbol FRPT.

== History ==
Freshpet was founded in Secaucus, New Jersey, in 2006 by Scott Morris, Cathal Walsh, and John Phelps, former pet food executives. It opened a factory in Quakertown, Pennsylvania, in 2006 and another in Bethlehem, Pennsylvania in 2013. Freshpet went public on the NASDAQ in November 2014, raising $164 million in its IPO with a market capitalization of $447 million.

In February 2020, the company was given a grant of $2.1 million by the Texas Enterprise Fund to build a plant in Ennis, Texas south of Dallas. In 2020, the company reported revenue of almost $319 million, an increase of about 30% and a net income loss of $3.19 million, up 130% on the previous year. It also reported losses in the four preceding years. In 2024, the company moved its headquarters to Bedminster, New Jersey.

== Products ==
Freshpet's cat food and dog food products are marketed as fresh, requiring refrigeration since the company's products have no preservatives. Freshpet was the first to distribute pet food in the fresh and refrigerated category across North America. After a 2007 crisis of wet and dried dog food tainted by melamine, Freshpet's uncontaminated fresh food products experienced rapid growth in many of stores carrying them.

As of 2021, the company's pet-food brands include Freshpet, Dog Joy, DogNation, Spring & Sprout, Vital, Homestyle Creations, and Nature's Fresh.
