= Russell 1000 Index =

U.S. large-cap stock market index

- Foundation: January 1, 1984; 42 years ago
- Operator: FTSE Russell
- Exchanges: NYSE; Nasdaq; Cboe BZX Exchange
- Trading symbol: RUI; .RUI; ^RUI
- Constituents: 1,004 (April 30, 2026)
- Type: Large cap
- Market cap: US$70.70 trillion (September 25, 2026)
- Weighting method: Free-float capitalization-weighted
- Related indices: Russell 3000 Index; Russell Indexes
- Website: www.lseg.com/en/ftse-russell/indices/russell-us/russell-1000
- Bloomberg: RIY:IND

Industry classification of the components of the index per the Global Industry Classification Standard as of August 11, 2026.
1. Information Technology (35.6%)
2. Financials (12.5%)
3. Communication Services (9.31%)
4. Consumer Discretionary (9.39%)
5. Health Care (9.33%)
6. Industrials (9.83%)
7. Consumer Staples (4.39%)
8. Energy (3.38%)
9. Utilities (2.02%)
10. Materials (2.09%)
11. Real Estate (2.02%)

The Russell 1000 is a stock market index tracking the stock performance of 1,000 companies listed on stock exchanges in the United States that are considered to have large or medium market capitalizations. The Russell 1000 is a subset of the Russell 3000, alongside the small-cap Russell 2000. The index is maintained by FTSE Russell and its components are determined via strict rules-based methodology, with an annual rebalancing in late June, the only time new entrants are added to the index.

The index is a public-float-weighted/capitalization-weighted index. The index includes approximately 93% of the total market capitalization of U.S. public companies, with an aggregate market capitalization of more than $70.70 trillion as of September 25, 2026. As of June 16, 2026, the median market capitalization of the components of the index is $17.5 billion and components range in market capitalization from $5.7 billion to $4.8 trillion.

Products linked to the Russell 1000 include index funds (exchange-traded funds/ETFs and mutual funds) as well as derivatives (options and futures contracts), which are available for trading in many countries with the goal of replicating the performance of the index. Also available are modified index funds; they replicate the performance of the index with modifications such as the use of covered call strategies, equal weighting, performance buffers, leverage, inclusion of only growth or value stocks, or exclusion of certain sectors, all with the goal of changing the risk/return and yield.

== Subsets ==
Approximate composition of the Russell 1000's market cap, as of April 30, 2025
1. Russell Top 200 Index (78%)
2. Russell Midcap Index (22%)

The Russell 1000 Index can be subdivided into the mega-cap Russell Top 200 Index (with about 200 constituents) and the Russell Midcap Index (with about 800 constituents). As of April 30, 2025, the Russell Top 200 and Russell Midcap comprised about 78% and 22%, respectively, of the Russell 1000's total market cap.

Other subsets of the Russell 1000 (all classified within the mega-cap segment) include:

- Russell Top 100 Index
- Russell Top 50 Mega Cap Index
- Russell Top 20 Index
- Russell Top 10 Index

The Russell Top 100 competes with the S&P 100 index. The Russell Top 50 Mega Cap, Top 20, and Top 10 indices respectively compete with the S&P 500 Top 50, S&P 500 Top 20, and S&P 500 Top 10 indices.

== Record values ==
| Category | All-time highs | |
|---|---|---|
| Closing | 4,252.62 | Thursday, August 13, 2026 |
| Intraday | 4,261.70 | Thursday, August 13, 2026 |

== Annual returns ==
Annual returns have been as follows:

| Year | Price return (excluding dividends) | Total return (including dividends) |
|---|---|---|
| 1995 | 34.44% | 37.77% |
| 1996 | 19.72% | 22.45% |
| 1997 | 30.49% | 32.85% |
| 1998 | 25.12% | 27.02% |
| 1999 | 19.46% | 20.91% |
| 2000 | −8.84% | −7.79% |
| 2001 | −13.59% | −12.45% |
| 2002 | −22.94% | −21.65% |
| 2003 | 27.54% | 29.89% |
| 2004 | 9.49% | 11.40% |
| 2005 | 4.37% | 6.27% |
| 2006 | 13.34% | 15.46% |
| 2007 | 3.86% | 5.77% |
| 2008 | −39.02% | −37.60% |
| 2009 | 25.47% | 28.43% |
| 2010 | 13.87% | 16.10% |
| 2011 | −0.51% | 1.50% |
| 2012 | 13.92% | 16.42% |
| 2013 | 30.44% | 33.11% |
| 2014 | 11.07% | 13.24% |
| 2015 | −1.09% | 0.92% |
| 2016 | 9.70% | 12.05% |
| 2017 | 19.34% | 21.69% |
| 2018 | −6.58% | −4.78% |
| 2019 | 28.89% | 31.43% |
| 2020 | 18.87% | 20.96% |
| 2021 | 24.76% | 26.45% |
| 2022 | −20.41% | −19.13% |
| 2023 | 24.51% | 26.53% |
| 2024 | 22.84% | 24.51% |
| 2025 | 15.89% | 17.37% |

== See also ==
- List of Russell 1000 companies
- Russell 2500 Index
