= Russell 2500 Index =

The Russell 2500 Index measures the performance of the 2,500 smallest companies (19% of total capitalization) in the Russell 3000 Index, with a weighted average market capitalization of approximately $4.3 billion, median capitalization of $1.2 billion and market capitalization of the largest company of $18.7 billion.

The index was launched on June 1, 1990 by Russell Investments and is maintained by FTSE Russell, a subsidiary of the London Stock Exchange Group. Its ticker symbol is ^R25I.

== Investments ==
The index is tracked by the iShares Russell 2500 ETF (CBOE: SMMD) index fund.

== Top 10 holdings ==
- Huntington Bancshares (Nasdaq: HBAN)
- Hologic (Nasdaq: HOLX)
- Mid-America Apartments (NYSE: MAA)
- Quintiles IMS Holdings (NYSE: Q)
- Alaska Air Group (NYSE: ALK)
- Idexx Laboratories (Nasdaq: IDXX)
- Snap-on (NYSE: SNA)
- Arch Capital Group (Nasdaq: ACGL)
- Lear Corporation (NYSE: LEA)
- E-Trade Financial (Nasdaq: ETFC)

(as of December 31, 2016)

== Top sectors by weight ==
- Financial Services
- Producer Durables
- Consumer Discretionary
- Technology
- Health Care

== See also ==
- Russell 2000 Index (small-cap)
- Russell 1000 Index (large-cap)
- Russell Small Cap Completeness Index
- Russell Indexes
