= S&P 100 =

American large-cap stock market index

- Foundation: June 15, 1983; 43 years ago
- Operator: S&P Dow Jones Indices
- Exchanges: Nasdaq; NYSE
- Trading symbol: OEX; ^OEX; SP100; ^SP100
- Constituents: 101 (May 29, 2026)
- Type: Large-cap / Mega-cap
- Market cap: US$49.9 trillion (May 29, 2026)
- Weighting method: Free-float capitalization-weighted
- Related indices: S&P 500
- Website: S&P 100

Industry classification of the components of the index as of March 31, 2026
1. Information Technology (38.9%)
2. Communication Services (13.5%)
3. Financials (11.3%)
4. Consumer Discretionary (10.2%)
5. Health Care (9.30%)
6. Industrials (5.90%)
7. Consumer Staples (5.80%)
8. Energy (3.10%)
9. Utilities (1.00%)
10. Materials (0.60%)
11. Real Estate (0.40%)

The S&P 100 (Standard and Poor's 100) is a stock market index of United States blue chip large-cap (and/or mega-cap) stocks maintained by S&P Dow Jones Indices.

The S&P 100 is a subset of the S&P 500 and the S&P 1500, and holds stocks that tend to be the largest and most established companies in the S&P 500. However, the S&P 100 actually includes 101 larger US company stocks due to holding two different share classes of Alphabet Inc.

Constituents of the S&P 100 are selected for sector balance and represent nearly 71% of the market capitalization of the S&P 500 and 61% of the market capitalization of the U.S. equity markets as of December 2024.

Index options on the S&P 100 are traded with the ticker symbol "OEX". Because of the popularity of these options, investors often refer to the index by its ticker symbol.

== History ==
In 1983, the CBOE created the first index options, based on its own index, the CBOE 100.

In 1993, CBOE created the Chicago Board Options Exchange Market Volatility Index (VIX), which was computed based on the price of S&P 100 options (at the time these were by far the most heavily traded index options). Then in 2003, they changed it to be based on the S&P 500.

== Statistics ==
S&P 100 within S&P 500, as of August 31, 2026
1. (72.6%) S&P 100: 49,994,155.94
2. (27.4%) Rest of S&P 500: 18,834,056.03
Total market cap values in US$ millions. Sources:

The mean free float market capitalization of the S&P 100 is over 3 times that of the S&P 500 ($135 bn vs $40 bn as of January 2017); as such, it is larger than a large-cap index. The volatility ("sigma") of individual companies within the S&P 100 is typically less than that of the S&P 500 and thus the corresponding volatility of the S&P 100 is lower. However, the correlation between the two indices is very high.

As of 2026, the S&P 100 comprises a dominant fraction (over 70%) of the wider S&P 500 index; see above pie chart.

== Investing ==
This index is tracked by the iShares S&P 100 ETF (NYSE Arca: OEF).

== Record values ==
As of May 14, 2026:

| Category | Value | Date |
|---|---|---|
| Closing | 3,844.99 | Thursday, September 3, 2026 |
| Intraday | 3,853.17 | Thursday, August 13, 2026 |

== Components ==
(as of September 21, 2026)

| Symbol | Name | Sector |
|---|---|---|
| AAPL | Apple Inc. | Information Technology |
| ABBV | AbbVie | Health Care |
| ABT | Abbott Laboratories | Health Care |
| ACN | Accenture | Information Technology |
| ADBE | Adobe Inc. | Information Technology |
| AMAT | Applied Materials | Information Technology |
| AMD | Advanced Micro Devices | Information Technology |
| AMGN | Amgen | Health Care |
| AMT | American Tower | Real Estate |
| AMZN | Amazon | Consumer Discretionary |
| ANET | Arista Networks | Information Technology |
| AVGO | Broadcom | Information Technology |
| AXP | American Express | Financials |
| BA | Boeing | Industrials |
| BAC | Bank of America | Financials |
| BKNG | Booking Holdings | Consumer Discretionary |
| BLK | BlackRock | Financials |
| BMY | Bristol Myers Squibb | Health Care |
| BNY | BNY Mellon | Financials |
| BRK.B | Berkshire Hathaway (Class B) | Financials |
| C | Citigroup | Financials |
| CAT | Caterpillar Inc. | Industrials |
| CMCSA | Comcast | Communication Services |
| COF | Capital One | Financials |
| COP | ConocoPhillips | Energy |
| COST | Costco | Consumer Staples |
| CRM | Salesforce | Information Technology |
| CSCO | Cisco | Information Technology |
| CVS | CVS Health | Health Care |
| CVX | Chevron Corporation | Energy |
| DE | Deere & Company | Industrials |
| DELL | Dell Technologies | Information Technology |
| DHR | Danaher Corporation | Health Care |
| DIS | Walt Disney Company (The) | Communication Services |
| DUK | Duke Energy | Utilities |
| EMR | Emerson Electric | Industrials |
| FDX | FedEx | Industrials |
| GD | General Dynamics | Industrials |
| GE | GE Aerospace | Industrials |
| GEV | GE Vernova | Industrials |
| GILD | Gilead Sciences | Health Care |
| GM | General Motors | Consumer Discretionary |
| GOOG | Alphabet Inc. (Class C) | Communication Services |
| GOOGL | Alphabet Inc. (Class A) | Communication Services |
| GS | Goldman Sachs | Financials |
| HD | Home Depot | Consumer Discretionary |
| IBM | IBM | Information Technology |
| INTC | Intel | Information Technology |
| INTU | Intuit | Information Technology |
| ISRG | Intuitive Surgical | Health Care |
| JNJ | Johnson & Johnson | Health Care |
| JPM | JPMorgan Chase | Financials |
| KO | Coca-Cola Company (The) | Consumer Staples |
| LIN | Linde plc | Materials |
| LLY | Eli Lilly and Company | Health Care |
| LMT | Lockheed Martin | Industrials |
| LOW | Lowe's | Consumer Discretionary |
| LRCX | Lam Research | Information Technology |
| MA | Mastercard | Financials |
| MCD | McDonald's | Consumer Discretionary |
| MDLZ | Mondelēz International | Consumer Staples |
| MDT | Medtronic | Health Care |
| META | Meta Platforms | Communication Services |
| MMM | 3M | Industrials |
| MO | Altria | Consumer Staples |
| MRK | Merck & Co. | Health Care |
| MS | Morgan Stanley | Financials |
| MSFT | Microsoft | Information Technology |
| MU | Micron Technology | Information Technology |
| NEE | NextEra Energy | Utilities |
| NFLX | Netflix, Inc. | Communication Services |
| NOW | ServiceNow | Information Technology |
| NVDA | Nvidia | Information Technology |
| ORCL | Oracle Corporation | Information Technology |
| PANW | Palo Alto Networks | Information Technology |
| PEP | PepsiCo | Consumer Staples |
| PFE | Pfizer | Health Care |
| PG | Procter & Gamble | Consumer Staples |
| PLTR | Palantir Technologies | Information Technology |
| PM | Philip Morris International | Consumer Staples |
| QCOM | Qualcomm | Information Technology |
| RTX | RTX Corporation | Industrials |
| SBUX | Starbucks | Consumer Discretionary |
| SCHW | Charles Schwab Corporation | Financials |
| SNDK | Sandisk | Information Technology |
| SO | Southern Company | Utilities |
| T | AT&T | Communication Services |
| TMO | Thermo Fisher Scientific | Health Care |
| TMUS | T-Mobile US | Communication Services |
| TSLA | Tesla, Inc. | Consumer Discretionary |
| TXN | Texas Instruments | Information Technology |
| UBER | Uber | Industrials |
| UNH | UnitedHealth Group | Health Care |
| UNP | Union Pacific Corporation | Industrials |
| UPS | United Parcel Service | Industrials |
| USB | U.S. Bancorp | Financials |
| V | Visa Inc. | Financials |
| VZ | Verizon | Communication Services |
| WFC | Wells Fargo | Financials |
| WMT | Walmart | Consumer Staples |
| XOM | ExxonMobil | Energy |

== Annual returns ==
The following table shows the price return of the S&P 100 since 1975:

| Year | Closing level | Change in index in points | Change in index in % |
|---|---|---|---|
| 1975 | 50.00 | | |
| 1976 | 58.23 | 8.23 | 16.46 |
| 1977 | 51.03 | −7.20 | −12.36 |
| 1978 | 52.99 | 1.96 | 3.84 |
| 1979 | 55.53 | 2.54 | 4.79 |
| 1980 | 68.83 | 13.30 | 23.95 |
| 1981 | 59.77 | −9.06 | −13.16 |
| 1982 | 71.08 | 11.31 | 18.93 |
| 1983 | 83.06 | 11.98 | 16.85 |
| 1984 | 82.54 | −0.52 | −0.63 |
| 1985 | 103.01 | 20.47 | 24.80 |
| 1986 | 115.55 | 12.54 | 12.17 |
| 1987 | 119.13 | 3.58 | 3.10 |
| 1988 | 131.93 | 12.80 | 10.74 |
| 1989 | 164.68 | 32.75 | 24.82 |
| 1990 | 155.22 | −9.46 | −5.74 |
| 1991 | 192.78 | 37.56 | 24.19 |
| 1992 | 198.32 | 5.54 | 2.87 |
| 1993 | 214.73 | 16.41 | 8.27 |
| 1994 | 214.32 | −0.41 | −0.19 |
| 1995 | 292.96 | 78.64 | 36.70 |
| 1996 | 359.99 | 67.03 | 22.88 |
| 1997 | 459.94 | 99.95 | 27.76 |
| 1998 | 604.03 | 144.09 | 31.33 |
| 1999 | 792.83 | 188.80 | 31.26 |
| 2000 | 686.45 | −106.38 | −13.42 |
| 2001 | 584.28 | −102.17 | −14.88 |
| 2002 | 444.75 | −139.53 | −23.88 |
| 2003 | 550.78 | 106.03 | 23.84 |
| 2004 | 575.29 | 24.51 | 4.45 |
| 2005 | 570.00 | −5.29 | −0.92 |
| 2006 | 660.41 | 90.41 | 15.86 |
| 2007 | 685.65 | 25.24 | 3.82 |
| 2008 | 431.54 | −254.11 | −37.06 |
| 2009 | 514.09 | 82.55 | 19.13 |
| 2010 | 565.90 | 51.81 | 10.08 |
| 2011 | 570.79 | 4.89 | 0.86 |
| 2012 | 646.61 | 75.82 | 13.28 |
| 2013 | 823.81 | 177.20 | 27.40 |
| 2014 | 908.38 | 84.57 | 10.27 |
| 2015 | 911.43 | 3.05 | 0.34 |
| 2016 | 991.43 | 80.00 | 8.78 |
| 2017 | 1,183.15 | 191.72 | 19.34 |
| 2018 | 1,113.87 | −69.28 | −5.86 |
| 2019 | 1,442.17 | 328.30 | 29.47 |
| 2020 | 1,720.50 | 278.33 | 19.30 |
| 2021 | 2,194.58 | 474.08 | 27.55 |
| 2022 | 1,709.17 | –485.41 | −22.12 |
| 2023 | 2,236.19 | 527.02 | 30.83 |
| 2024 | 2,890.23 | 654.04 | 29.25 |
| 2025 | 3,432.34 | 542.11 | 18.76 |

== See also ==
- S&P Global 100
- Russell Top 50 Index
- Russell Top 200 Index
