= Russell Microcap Index =

Financial metric

The Russell Microcap Index measures the performance of the microcap segment of the U.S. equity market. It makes up less than 3% of the U.S. equity market. It includes 1,000 of the smallest securities in the Russell 2000 Index based on a combination of their market cap and current index membership and it also includes up to the next 1,000 stocks. As of 31 December 2016, the weighted average market capitalization for a company in the index was $535 million; the median market cap was $228 million. The market cap of the largest company in the index was $3.6 billion.

The index was launched on June 1, 2005 by Russell Investments and is maintained by FTSE Russell, a subsidiary of the London Stock Exchange Group. Its ticker symbol is ^RUMIC.

== Records ==
In February 2021, during the everything bubble, a record 14 members of the index exceeded the market capitalization of the smallest member of the S&P 500 Index.

== Investing ==
The Russell Microcap Index is tracked by the iShares Micro-Cap ETF (NYSE Arca: IWC).

== Top 10 holdings ==
- Mercury Systems (Nasdaq: MRCY)
- Centerstate Banks (Nasdaq: CSFL)
- Lakeland Financial (Nasdaq: LKFN)
- Merit Medical Systems (Nasdaq: MMSI)
- Team Inc (NYSE: TISI)
- Patrick Industries (Nasdaq: PATK)
- Synergy Pharmaceuticals (Nasdaq: SGYP)
- Hanmi Financial (NYSE: HAFC)
- Aerie Pharmaceuticals (Nasdaq: AERI)
- Stewart Information Services (NYSE: STC)

(as of December 31, 2016)

== Top sectors by weight ==
- Financial Services
- Health Care
- Consumer Discretionary
- Technology
- Producer Durables

== See also ==
- Russell 2000 Index
- Russell 1000 Index
- Russell Indexes
