= Russell Top 200 Index =

Measuring Index for large company performance

- Foundation: September 1, 1992; 34 years ago
- Operator: FTSE Russell
- Exchanges: New York Stock Exchange
- Trading symbol: ^RT200
- Constituents: 200
- Type: Megacap
- Weighting method: Free-float capitalization-weighted
- Related indices: Russell 1000 Index; Russell Indexes
- Website: www.lseg.com/en/ftse-russell/indices/russell-us

Approximate composition of the Russell 1000's market cap, as of April 30, 2025
1. Russell Top 200 Index (78%)
2. Russell Midcap Index (22%)

The Russell Top 200 Index measures the performance of the 200 largest companies (megacaps; 63% of total market capitalization) in the Russell 1000 Index, with a weighted average market capitalization of $186 billion. The median capitalization is $48 billion; the smallest company in the index has an approximate capitalization of $14 billion.

The index was launched on September 1, 1992 by Russell Investments and is maintained by FTSE Russell, a subsidiary of the London Stock Exchange Group. Its ticker symbol is ^RT200.

== Investing ==
The Russell Top 200 Index is tracked by an exchange-traded fund, iShares Russell Top 200 Index (NYSE Arca: IWL).

== Subsets ==
Several Russell Indexes are effectively subsets of the Russell Top 200:

- Russell Top 100 Index
- Russell Top 50 Mega Cap Index
- Russell Top 20 Index
- Russell Top 10 Index

The Russell Top 100 competes with the S&P 100 index. The Russell Top 50 Mega Cap, Top 20, and Top 10 indices respectively compete with the S&P 500 Top 50, S&P 500 Top 20, and S&P 500 Top 10 indices.

== Top 10 holdings ==
As of December 31, 2016

- Apple Inc. (Nasdaq: AAPL)
- Microsoft Corp (Nasdaq: MSFT)
- Exxon Mobil Corp (NYSE: XOM)
- Johnson & Johnson (NYSE: JNJ)
- JPMorgan Chase & Co (NYSE: JPM)
- Berkshire Hathaway Inc (NYSE: BRK.B)
- Amazon.com (Nasdaq: AMZN)
- General Electric (NYSE: GE)
- AT&T (NYSE: T)
- Meta Platforms (Nasdaq: META)

== See also ==
- Russell 1000 Index
- S&P 100 - a roughly comparable US megacap stock index
