= Public float =

Public-owned portion of a corporation

In the context of stock markets, the public float or free float represents the portion of shares of a corporation that are in the hands of public investors as opposed to shares held by promoters, company officers, controlling interest investors, or governments. This number is sometimes seen as a better way of calculating market capitalization, because it provides a more accurate reflection (than entire market capitalization) of what public investors consider the company to be worth. In this context, the float may refer to all the shares outstanding that can be publicly traded.

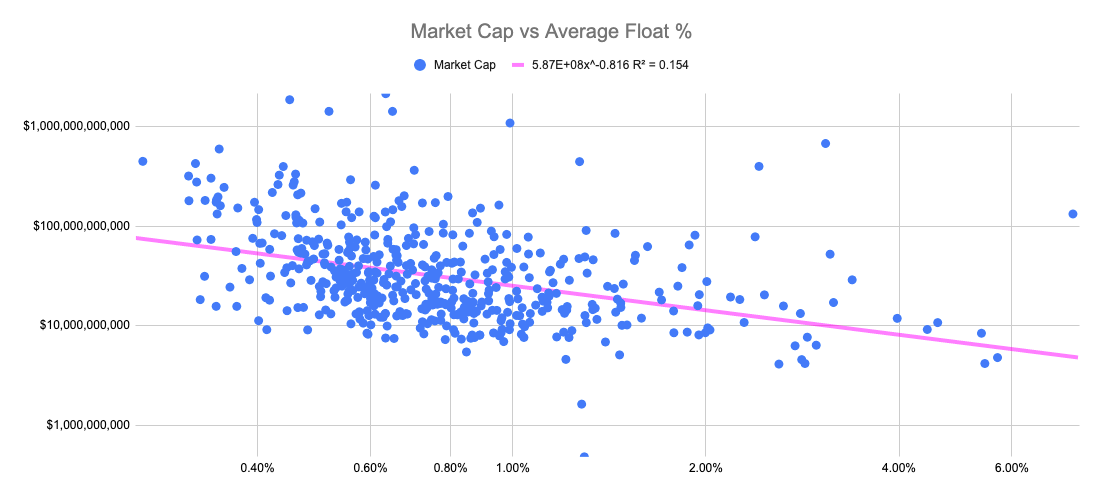
SP500 Market Cap. vs Float % (June 2022 data)

== Calculating public float ==
The float is calculated by subtracting the locked-in shares from outstanding shares. For example, a company may have 10 million outstanding shares, with 3 million of them in a locked-in position; this company's float would be 7 million (multiplied by the share price). Stocks with smaller floats tend to be more volatile than those with larger floats. In general, the large holdings of founding shareholders, corporate cross-holdings, and government holdings in partially privatized companies are excluded when calculating the size of a public float.

== Public float in the World ==
There are certain regulations to offer public floats, though these regulations might differ from region to region.

For instance, to offer public floats in the World, a company must be incorporated, i.e. be a public limited company under International law. Also, the company should have published or filed audit accounts for at least a three-year period, have trading and revenue earning records for at least three years, its higher management and directors must be competent enough to run a business at that scale, and the company must show that it has a working capital for at least 12 months. Moreover, once the company is listed, the business must be independent from any shareholder with controlling interest (anyone owning more than 30% of the company shares), and after the company is listed, at least 25% of its shares must be in the hands of the general public, that is public float, and the company must have a total market capitalization of not less than £700,000.

== Advantages of public floating ==
=== Greater access to funds ===
By offering a public float, companies gain access to new and large capital, as the general public can invest in the company. This new capital is then used to increase the company's profits.

=== Opportunities to reduce debt ===
By public floating, a company gains access to interest-free capital as there is no interest to be paid on shares. Though a dividend may be involved, the terms of dividend liability are far more flexible than terms for loans. Along with this, shares are not considered as a debt, and by public floating, companies can reduce their debts creating a better asset to liability ratio.

=== Enhancement of credibility and higher public profile ===
By public floating, companies can enhance their credit image. As banks and other credit-providing institutions provide credit, more often to a public limited company along with this, sometimes favorable terms are also offered by credit providers because of public limited company status. Along with enhanced credibility, companies can also get higher media coverage and attention of general public.

== Disadvantages of public floating ==
=== Company is open to market fluctuations ===
By public floating, companies are vulnerable to threats of speculations and market fluctuations. During the 2008 financial crisis, several companies went bankrupt because of fluctuations in the stock market, severely limiting their operating capital to the extent that they were unable to pay their creditors and were forced to liquidate their operational assets.

=== Costs of public floating ===
Costs of company registration are also very high making it difficult for certain small businesses to float shares. Along with higher costs, processes of registering and running a company are also very complex. For example, in the UK, in order to run a public limited company, a register of the directors, shareholders, and any shareholder votes, as well as all details of the company's finances must be compiled and kept for a minimum of six years. Along with this, a comprehensive accounting record is also needed like sales and whom they are made to (until and unless it is a retail business), purchases and from whom they are supplied, stock and debts – all of them are necessary to be provided. Along with all these costs, taxes are also to be paid while a company is public floating. For instance, in the UK a company has to pay corporation tax which is 20% if the profit per year is £300,000 or less and 21% if profit is above £300,000.

=== Pressure to perform ===
Public floating also increases pressure on a company to perform. Whenever the general public, as company shareholders, demand dividends without keeping the company's economic circumstances in proper perspective, it increases performance pressure on the company. Secondly, sometimes companies provide false financial reports to sell shares which lead towards further complications in market. In 2005, AIG had to pay a fine of $1.7 billion as a result of improper accounting. Additionally, Lehman Brothers went bankrupt in 2008 after using a small firm to secretly manipulate its balance sheets. Both cases illustrate that, as a result of pressure to sell shares, companies may manipulate their financial statements, and later face the consequences (Lehman Brothers' bankruptcy in 2008, AIG's bailout by the U.S. government in 2008).

=== Less public float ===
Less public float may cause illiquidity of stocks of companies due to the low public holdings. One may not be able to transact, buy or sell orders on a respected stock exchange.

== See also ==
- Concentrated stock
- Market capitalization
- Open market
- Restricted stock
- Authorised capital
- Shares outstanding
- Treasury stock
