= Small cap company =

Shares offered by a relatively small company in terms of value

A small cap company is a company whose market capitalization (shares x value of each share) is considered small. In the United States, this includes market caps from $250 million to $2 billion (as of 2022).

== Overview ==
A small cap company typically has under $2 billion market cap. Small companies generally are not able to secure the best (prime) borrowing rates and wield reduced power, including a smaller market share. Being small, they are also less financially stable than larger companies, and are more likely to become bankrupt. However, they do generally have more growth potential and over time have greater but more volatile expected returns.

== See also ==
- Megacap stock
- Market capitalization § Market cap terms, including large-cap and mid-cap
- Microcap stock, including nano-caps
- List of public corporations by market capitalization
- Market price
- Authorised capital
- Treasury stock
