= Shares outstanding =

All shares held and authorized by a public company's investors

Shares outstanding are all the shares of a corporation that have been authorized, issued and purchased by investors and are held by them. They are distinguished from treasury shares, which are shares held by the corporation itself, thus representing no exercisable rights. Shares outstanding and treasury shares together amount to the number of issued shares.

Shares outstanding can be calculated as either basic or fully diluted. The basic count is the current number of shares. Dividend distributions and voting in the general meeting of shareholders are calculated according to this number. The fully diluted shares outstanding count, on the other hand, includes diluting securities, such as warrants, capital notes or convertibles. If the company has any diluting securities, this indicates the potential future increased number of shares outstanding.

== Finding the number of shares outstanding ==
The number of outstanding shares may change due to changes in the number of issued shares, as well as the change in treasury shares. Both can occur at any time of the year. There are several useful public sources to find the number of shares outstanding of a given corporation.

=== Public traded companies' investor relations ===
The financial reporting obligation of the publicly traded company also ensures the publication of issued and outstanding shares. The reports are usually available in the investor relations section of the company's website. Web directories are supporting direct access to company websites. Publicly traded companies bundle the reports in the investor relations section, e.g. Deutsche Bank, Eni S.p.a., AB InBev, EDP - Energias do Brasil SA or Accor SA.

=== Authorized information service ===
In many countries, there is an information service authorized or provided by the local financial authority which gives access to companies' financial reporting. In the United States, the number of shares outstanding may be obtained from quarterly filings with the U.S. Securities and Exchange Commission. Quarterly filings are accessible using the US EDGAR. In Germany, those figures are available using the German company register, the central platform for storage of company data. In the Netherlands, the Netherlands Authority for the Financial Markets (AFM) provides on its website a register of issued capital. In Italy, the Commissione Nazionale per le Società e la Borsa (CONSOB) provides on its website a register of issuers with latest total shares.

=== Local stock exchanges ===
Since outstanding shares are an essential detail of publicly traded companies the number can be found on the local stock exchange websites. Beyond stock charts and listed prices, they also provide the companies' number of outstanding shares. Examples include the Brazilian BM&FBOVESPA, the Swiss SIX, the Borsa Italiana and the Tel Aviv Stock Exchange (where shares outstanding are termed "Capital Listed for Trading").

== See also ==
- Share capital
- Public float
