= Russell 2000 Index =

U.S. small-cap stock market index

Russell 2000
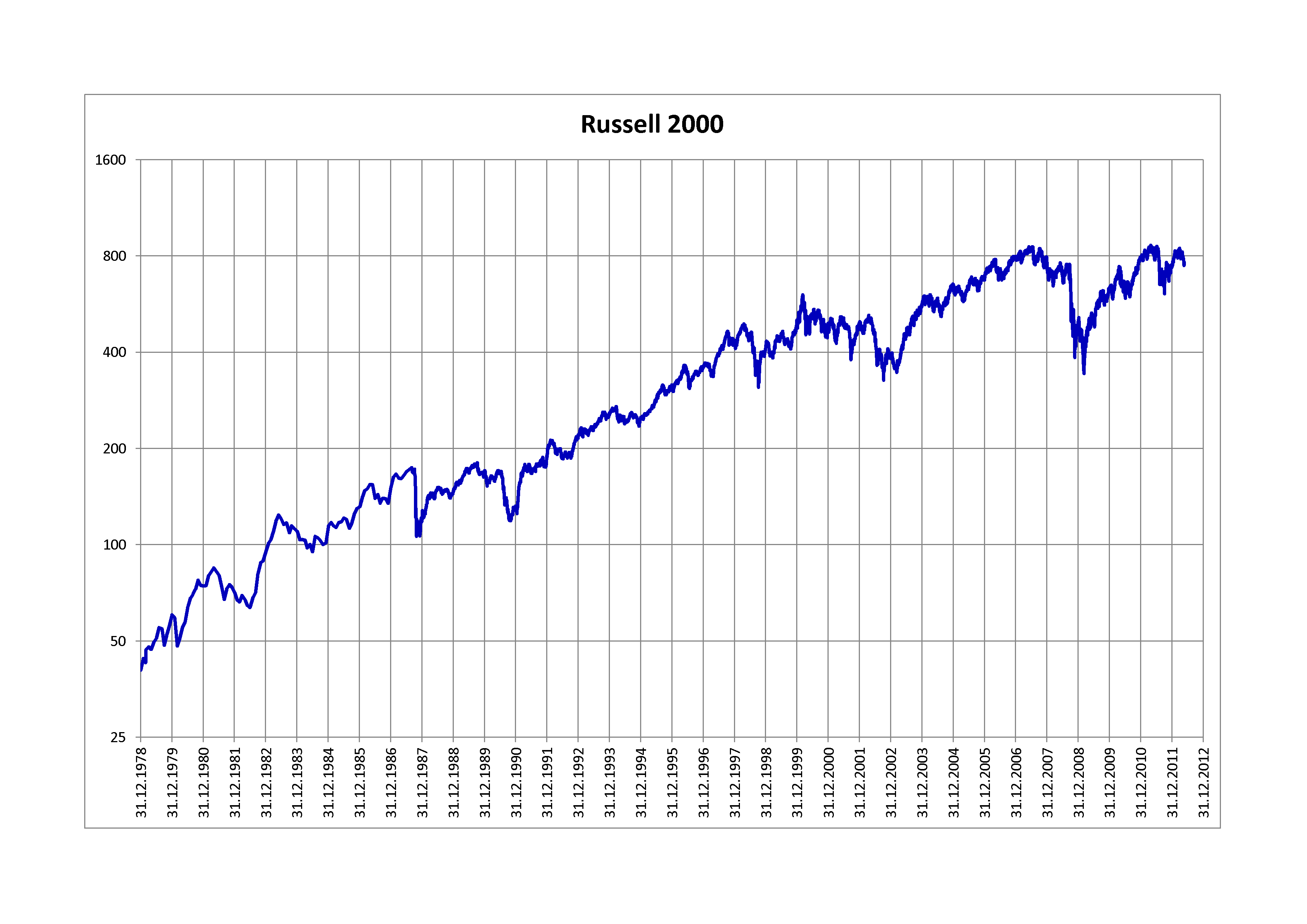
- Index between 1978–2012
- Foundation: January 1, 1984; 42 years ago
- Operator: FTSE Russell
- Exchanges: New York Stock Exchange; Nasdaq; OTC Markets Group
- Trading symbol: ^RUT; RUT; RTY
- Constituents: 1,958 (July 31, 2026)
- Type: Small-cap
- Market cap: US$3.5 trillion (April 30, 2026)
- Weighting method: Free-float capitalization-weighted
- Related indices: Russell 3000 Index; Russell Indexes
- Website: www.lseg.com/en/ftse-russell/indices/russell-2000-index

Industry classification of the components of the index per the Global Industry Classification Standard as of August 11, 2026, weighted by market cap.
1. Health Care (20.2%)
2. Financials (19.0%)
3. Industrials (14.5%)
4. Information Technology (13.3%)
5. Consumer Discretionary (9.26%)
6. Energy (6.40%)
7. Real Estate (5.62%)
8. Materials (4.39%)
9. Utilities (2.72%)
10. Communication Services (2.38%)
11. Consumer Staples (1.95%)

The Russell 2000 is a stock market index tracking the stock performance of 2,000 companies listed on stock exchanges in the United States that are considered to have small market capitalizations. The Russell 2000 is a subset of the Russell 3000, alongside the large-cap Russell 1000. The index is maintained by FTSE Russell and its components are determined via strict rules-based methodology, with an annual rebalancing in late June, the only time new entrants are added to the index.

The index is a public-float-weighted/capitalization-weighted index. The index includes approximately 5% of the total market capitalization of U.S. public companies, with an aggregate market capitalization of about $3.5 trillion as of June 30, 2026. The median market capitalization of the components of the index is $1.1 billion and components range in market capitalization from $146 million to $2.7 billion.

Products linked to the Russell 2000 include index funds (exchange-traded funds/ETFs and mutual funds) as well as derivatives (options and futures contracts), which are available for trading in many countries with the goal of replicating the performance of the index. Also available are modified index funds; they replicate the performance of the index with modifications such as the use of covered call strategies, equal weighting, performance buffers, leverage, inclusion of only growth or value stocks, or exclusion of certain sectors, all with the goal of changing the risk/return and yield.

== Record values ==
Category	All-Time Highs	
Previous Record Closing	3,052.85	Thursday, August 13, 2026
Closing	3,068.42	Friday, August 14, 2026
Intraday	3,069.71	Friday, August 14, 2026

The index first traded above the 1,000 level on May 20, 2013, above the 2,000 level on December 23, 2020 and above the 3,000 level on June 22, 2026.

== Annual returns ==
Annual returns have been as follows:

Year	Price return (excluding dividends)	Total return (including dividends)
1995	26.21%	28.45%
1996	14.76%	16.49%
1997	20.52%	22.36%
1998	−3.45%	−2.55%
1999	19.62%	21.26%
2000	−4.20%	−3.02%
2001	1.03%	2.49%
2002	−21.58%	−20.48%
2003	45.37%	47.25%
2004	17.00%	18.33%
2005	3.32%	4.55%
2006	17.00%	18.37%
2007	−2.75%	−1.57%
2008	−34.80%	−33.79%
2009	25.22%	27.17%
2010	25.31%	26.85%
2011	−5.45%	−4.18%
2012	14.63%	16.35%
2013	37.00%	38.82%
2014	3.53%	4.89%
2015	−5.71%	−4.41%
2016	19.48%	21.31%
2017	13.14%	14.65%
2018	−12.18%	−11.01%
2019	23.72%	25.52%
2020	18.36%	19.96%
2021	13.69%	14.82%
2022	−21.56%	−20.44%
2023	15.09%	16.93%
2024	10.02%	11.54%
2025	11.29%	12.81%

== See also ==
- S&P 600 – American small-cap stock market index
- List of largest daily changes in the Russell 2000
