= Market capitalization =

Total value of a public company's outstanding shares

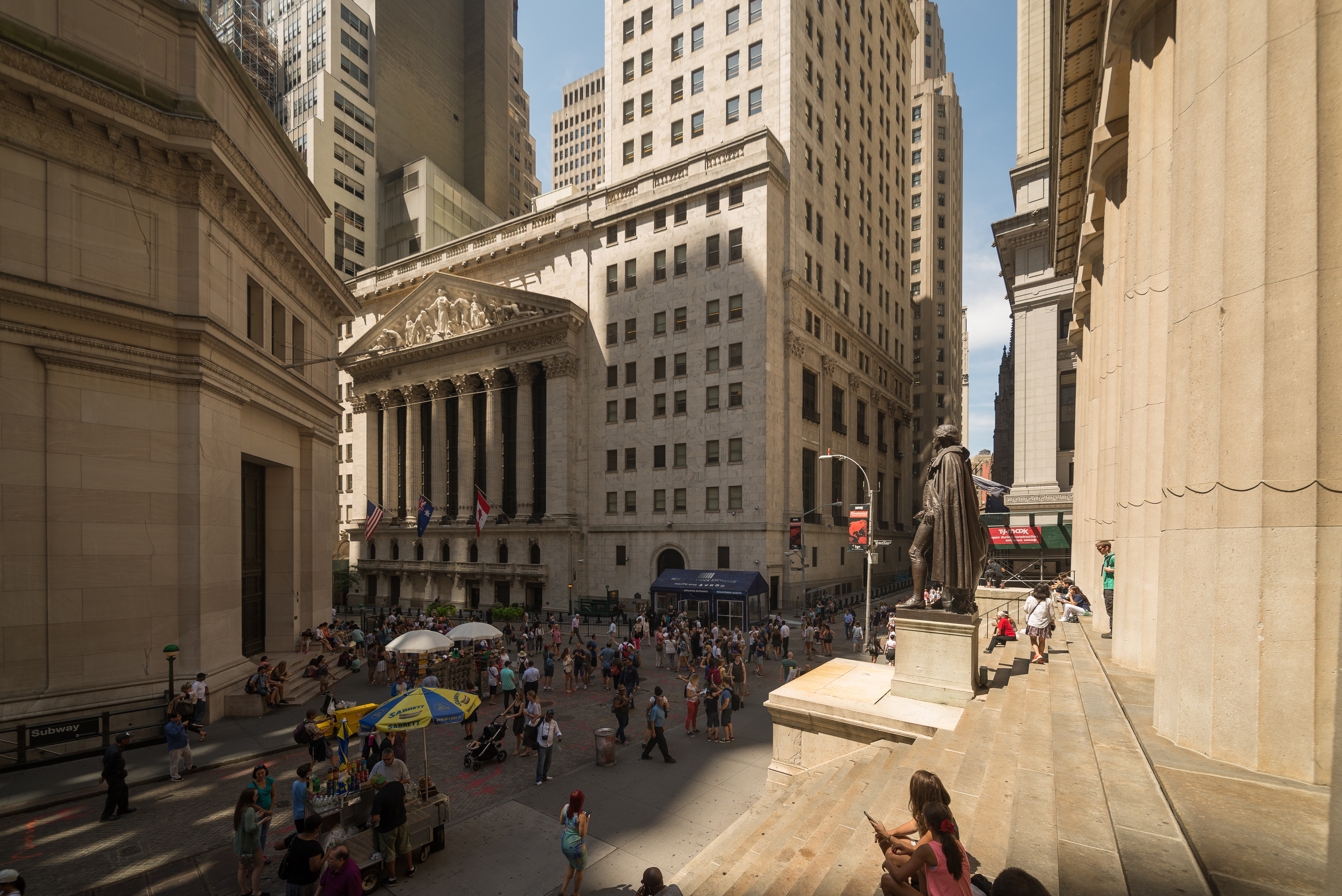
The New York Stock Exchange on Wall Street, the world's largest stock exchange in terms of total market capitalization of its listed companies, as of 2010

Market capitalization, sometimes referred to as market cap, is the total value of a publicly traded company's outstanding common shares owned by stockholders.

Market capitalization is equal to the market price per common share multiplied by the number of common shares outstanding.

== Description ==
Market capitalization is sometimes used to rank the size of companies. It measures only the equity component of a company's capital structure, and does not reflect management's decision as to how much debt (or leverage) is used to finance the firm. A more comprehensive measure of a firm's size is enterprise value (EV), which gives effect to outstanding debt, preferred stock, and other factors. For insurance firms, a value called the embedded value (EV) has been used.

It is also used in ranking the relative size of stock exchanges, being a measure of the sum of the market capitalizations of all companies listed on each stock exchange. The total capitalization of stock markets or economic regions may be compared with other economic indicators (e.g. the Buffett indicator).

== Calculation ==
Market cap is given by the formula $\text{MC} = N \times P$, where MC is the market capitalization, N is the number of common shares outstanding, and P is the market price per common share.

For example, if a company has 4 million common shares outstanding, and the closing price per share is $20, its market capitalization is then $80 million. If the closing price per share rises to $21, the market cap becomes $84 million. If it drops to $19 per share, the market cap falls to $76 million. This is in contrast to mercantile pricing where purchase price, average price and sale price may differ due to transaction costs.

Not all of the outstanding shares trade on the open market. The number of shares trading on the open market is called the float. It is equal to or less than N because N includes shares that are restricted from trading. The free-float market cap uses just the floating number of shares in the calculation, generally resulting in a smaller number.

== Market cap terms ==
Traditionally, companies were divided into large-cap, mid-cap, and small-cap. The terms mega-cap and micro-cap have since come into common use, and nano-cap is sometimes heard. Large caps have a slow growth rate as compared to small caps. Different numbers are used by different indexes; there is no official definition of, or full consensus agreement about, the exact cutoff values. The cutoffs may be defined as percentiles rather than in nominal dollars. The definitions expressed in nominal dollars need to be adjusted over decades due to inflation, population change, and overall market valuation (for example, $1 billion was a large market cap in 1950, but it is not very large now), and market caps are likely to be different country to country.

=== In the United States ===
==== Regulatory agencies ====
FINRA's investor education materials state that the following is a typical (not official) categorization of stocks by market capitalization:

Market cap categories per FINRA
| Category | Market capitalization of individual stock (US$ billions) | |
| Category | (FINRA, 2022) | (GDP deflator adjusted to 2025 US$) |
|---|---|---|
| Mega-cap | ≥ $200 | ≥ $219 |
| Large-cap | $10 – $200 | $11 – $219 |
| Mid-cap | $2 – $10 | $2 – $11 |
| Small-cap | $0.25 – $2 | $0.27 – $2 |
| Micro-cap | < $0.25 | < $0.27 |

The U.S. Securities and Exchange Commission notes that nano-cap stocks, in cases when they're separated from micro-caps, are typically defined as stocks with a market capitalization less than $50 million (as of 2013); which is equivalent to less than $68 million in 2025.

==== S&P Dow Jones Indices ====
S&P Dow Jones Indices (S&P DJI) defines 3 major US indices segmented by market capitalization. The components of these indices are selected by committee, but in order to be eligible, among other requirements, a stock's market capitalization at the time of addition must be within the respective range in the following table:

Market cap requirements for major S&P indices, as of 2025
| Index | Segment | Market capitalization required for addition |
|---|---|---|
| S&P 500 | Large-cap | ≥ US$20.5 billion |
| S&P 400 | Mid-cap | $7.4 billion – $20.5 billion |
| S&P 600 | Small-cap | $1 billion – $7.4 billion |

These market cap eligibility criteria are only for addition to these indices, not for continued membership in an index. As a result, an S&P index constituent that appears to violate criteria for addition to that index is not removed unless ongoing conditions warrant an index change.

Although there is no micro-cap S&P index, S&P DJI does offer two Dow Jones micro-cap indices:

Market cap statistics of Dow Jones microcap indices, as of September 30, 2026
| Index | Constituents | Market capitalization of constituents (in US$ millions) | | | | Source |
| Index | Constituents | Smallest | Median | Mean | Largest | Source |
|---|---|---|---|---|---|---|
| Dow Jones U.S. Micro-Cap Total Stock Market Index | 1316 | 0.04 | 73.29 | 142.26 | 832.48 | |
| Dow Jones Select Micro-Cap Index | 135 | 167.74 | 499.45 | 510.46 | 1,164.56 | |

The Dow Jones U.S. Micro-Cap Total Stock Market Index "is designed to provide a comprehensive measure of the micro-cap segment of the US stock market", and consists of eligible stocks with market caps smaller than the largest 3000. The Dow Jones Select Micro-Cap Index consists of microcaps with relatively high liquidity and better fundamentals.

==== Morningstar Indexes ====
Another index provider, Morningstar, Inc., defines its segments conceptually in terms of target ranges of top percentages of total US investable equity market capitalization, calculating actual, precise dollar-value breakpoints between the segments on a quarterly basis:

Morningstar market capitalization segments
| Segment | | | Top market cap percentage range | Minimum market cap (Q2 2026) | Companies (as of Sept 30, 2025) | Notes |
|---|---|---|---|---|---|---|
| Core cap | Large cap | Mega cap | 0 – 70% | $94,234,256,812 | 179 | Top 70% of total market cap |
| Core cap | Large cap | Mid cap | 70 – 85% | $29,546,026,000 | 285 | Next 15% of total market cap |
| Core cap | Small cap | | 85 – 98% | $2,984,336,260 | 1,309 | Next 13% of total market cap |
| Micro cap | | | 98 – 100% | None | 1,819 | Last/bottom 2% of total market cap |

Morningstar defines its "large cap" segment as simply the combination of its mega cap and mid cap segments (i.e. top 85% of total market cap), rather than as a disjoint segment. Morningstar also defines a "core cap" segment, consisting of all segments above micro-cap (i.e. the top 98% of total market cap).

==== Russell Indexes ====
Index provider FTSE Russell defines its segments by sorting all eligible companies by market cap, and then taking the top or bottom N companies (by count) from the list (or from another segment), where N is a fixed constant for each index which is often included in the index's name:

Russell Indexes market cap segments, as of August 31, 2026
| Index | Segment | Holdings | | Market cap of holdings (US$ billions) | | | Notes | Source |
| Index | Segment | Target | Actual | Median | Mean | Largest | Notes | Source |
|---|---|---|---|---|---|---|---|---|
| Russell Top 200 | Megacap | 200 | 201 | 125 | 1,817.5 | 5,365 | Approx. 200 largest companies in the Russell 1000 | |
| Russell 1000 | Large-cap | 1,000 | 1,017 | 17.7 | 1,467.5 | 5,365 | Approx. 1,000 largest companies in the Russell 3000 | |
| Russell Midcap Index | Mid-cap | 800 | 816 | 13.4 | 33.4 | 114.6 | Approx. 800 smallest companies in the Russell 1000, i.e. excluding the Russell Top 200 | |
| Russell 2000 | Small-cap | 2,000 | 1,953 | 1.14 | 4.05 | 12.1 | Approx. 2,000 smallest companies in the Russell 3000 | |
| Russell Microcap Index | Microcap | 2,000 | 1,341 | 0.267 | 0.889 | 3.42 | Approx. 1,000 smallest companies in the Russell 2000, combined with 1,000 smallest eligible companies in the Russell 3000E Index | |

However, the Russell Indexes also apply banding to decrease transient changes to their membership, thus making the target holding numbers only approximate.

Similar to Morningstar, Russell's "large cap" segment is basically the combination of its megacap and mid-cap segments. Also, roughly the largest half of Russell's microcap segment overlaps with the smallest half of its small-cap segment.

=== In the United Kingdom ===
Market cap statistics for major FTSE indices, as of May 29, 2026
| Index | Category | Constituents | Market capitalization of constituents (in GBP millions) | | | | Source |
| Index | Category | Constituents | Smallest | Median | Mean | Largest | Source |
|---|---|---|---|---|---|---|---|
| FTSE 100 | Large-cap | 100 | 2,006 | 8,206 | 24,920 | 239,090 | |
| FTSE 250 | Mid-cap | 250 | 124 | 913 | 1,196 | 4,466 | |
| FTSE SmallCap | Small-cap | 176 | 22 | 191 | 200 | 488 | |
| FTSE Fledgling | Micro-cap | 36 | 1 | 17 | 22 | 77 | |

== Significance for investing ==
Very generally speaking, a corporation's market cap correlates to how far it has progressed in its development journey. Small cap companies are generally younger, more focused companies, with more potential for faster growth in their future. By contrast, large cap companies are generally more mature companies, with more diverse income streams; thus, their incomes and stock prices tend to be more stable, but they also tend to have less future growth potential. High-quality large caps are sometimes termed blue chips.

Small caps may be subject to the uncertainties of new or growing markets, and may be in niche or emerging industries. Due to this relative instability, small caps are generally less able to weather negative macroeconomic situations than large caps are.

Therefore, broadly speaking, when investing in stocks, there is risk–return spectrum related to market cap. Small cap stocks have greater volatility, but greater potential return; whereas large caps have lower volatility, but also lower potential return. In factor investing, this historical observation is known as the size premium. Small caps are thus generally categorized as riskier or more aggressive investments than large caps, which are seen as less risky, more conservative investments.

== Historical data ==
The approximate total market capitalization of all publicly traded companies in the USA was:

- 2023: US$48.98 trillion
- 2024: US$62.19 trillion
- October 3rd 2025: US$69.244 trillion

=== Historical estimates of world market cap ===
Total market capitalization of all publicly traded companies in the world from 1975:

| Year | World market cap | | Number of listed companies |
| Year | (in bn. US$) | (% of GDP) | Number of listed companies |
|---|---|---|---|
| 1975 | 1,149 | 27.1 | 14,577 |
| 1980 | 2,525 | 29.4 | 17,273 |
| 1985 | 4,684 | 46.7 | 20,555 |
| 1990 | 9,519 | 50.4 | 23,732 |
| 1991 | 11,340 | 56.4 | 24,666 |
| 1992 | 10,819 | 49.9 | 24,947 |
| 1993 | 13,897 | 61.3 | 28,300 |
| 1994 | 14,639 | 60.3 | 30,290 |
| 1995 | 17,263 | 63.2 | 33,379 |
| 1996 | 19,806 | 71.2 | 35,617 |
| 1997 | 22,029 | 79.6 | 36,946 |
| 1998 | 24,555 | 88.5 | 37,928 |
| 1999 | 33,181 | 114 | 38,414 |
| 2000 | 30,925 | 100 | 39,892 |
| 2001 | 26,792 | 87.8 | 40,157 |
| 2002 | 22,802 | 72.2 | 38,894 |
| 2003 | 31,107 | 84.3 | 41,051 |
| 2004 | 36,540 | 88.6 | 38,724 |
| 2005 | 40,512 | 91.9 | 39,096 |
| 2006 | 50,074 | 105 | 43,104 |
| 2007 | 60,456 | 113 | 44,034 |
| 2008 | 32,418 | 55.6 | 43,949 |
| 2009 | 47,471 | 83.0 | 42,669 |
| 2010 | 54,259 | 86.4 | 43,427 |
| 2011 | 47,521 | 68.0 | 44,323 |
| 2012 | 54,503 | 77.6 | 43,772 |
| 2013 | 64,367 | 88.0 | 44,853 |
| 2014 | 67,177 | 89.3 | 45,743 |
| 2015 | 62,268 | 93.6 | 43,983 |
| 2016 | 65,117 | 96 | 43,806 |
| 2017 | 79,501 | 110 | 43,440 |
| 2018 | 68,893 | 93.4 | 44,910 |
| 2019 | 78,825 | 108 | 49,792 |
| 2020 | 93,686 | 132 | 50,055 |
| 2021 | 111,159 | 130 | 52,292 |
| 2022 | 93,688 | 105 | 51,026 |
| 2023 | 102,950 | 116 | 48,748 |
| 2024 | 115,090 | 130 | 47,980 |
| 2025 | 141,300 | | 53,087 |

== See also ==
- Authorised capital
- List of countries by stock market capitalization
- List of public corporations by market capitalization
- Market price
- Share repurchase
- Treasury stock
