= Treasury stock =

Stock which is bought back by the issuing company

A treasury stock or reacquired stock is stock which is bought back by the issuing company, reducing the amount of outstanding stock on the open market ("open market" including insiders' holdings).

Stock repurchases are used as a tax efficient method to put cash into shareholders' hands, rather than paying dividends, in jurisdictions that treat capital gains more favorably. Sometimes, companies repurchase their stock when they feel that it is undervalued on the open market. Other times, companies repurchase their stock to reduce dilution from incentive compensation plans for employees. Another reason for stock repurchase is to protect the company against a takeover threat.

The United Kingdom equivalent of treasury stock as used in the United States is treasury share. Treasury stocks in the UK refers to government bonds or gilts.

== Limitations of treasury stock ==
- Treasury stock is not entitled to receive a dividend
- Treasury stock has no voting rights
- Total treasury stock can not exceed the maximum proportion of total capitalization specified by law in the relevant country

When shares are repurchased, they may either be canceled or held for reissue. If not canceled, such shares are referred to as treasury shares. Technically, a repurchased share is a company's own share that has been bought back after having been issued and fully paid.

The possession of treasury shares does not give the company the right to vote, to exercise preemptive rights as a shareholder, to receive cash dividends, or to receive assets on company liquidation. Treasury shares are essentially the same as unissued capital, which is not classified as an asset on the balance sheet, as an asset should have probable future economic benefits. Treasury shares simply reduce ordinary share capital.

== Buying back shares ==
=== Benefits ===
In an efficient market, a company buying back its stock should have no effect on its price per share valuation. If the market fairly prices a company's shares at $50/share, and the company buys back 100 shares for $5,000, it now has $5,000 less cash but there are 100 fewer shares outstanding; the net effect should be that the underlying value of each share is unchanged. Additionally, buying back shares will improve price/earnings ratios due to the reduced number of shares (and unchanged earnings) and improve earnings per share ratios due to fewer shares outstanding (and unchanged earnings).

If the market is not efficient, the company's shares may be underpriced. In that case a company can benefit its other shareholders by buying back shares. If a company's shares are overpriced, then a company is actually hurting its remaining shareholders by buying back stock.

=== Incentives ===
One other reason for a company to buy back its own stock is to reward holders of stock options. Call option holders are hurt by dividend payments, since, typically, they are not eligible to receive them. A share buyback program may increase the value of remaining shares (if the buyback is executed when shares are under-priced); if so, call option holders benefit. A dividend payment short term always decreases the value of shares after the payment, so, for stocks with regularly scheduled dividends, on the day shares go ex-dividend, call option holders always lose whereas put option holders benefit. This does not apply to unscheduled (special) dividends since the strike prices of options are typically adjusted to reflect the amount of the special dividend. Finally, if the sellers into a corporate buyback are actually the call option holders themselves, they may directly benefit from temporary unrealistically favorable pricing.

=== After buyback ===
Shares purchased into the treasury are recorded on the company's balance sheet as an offset or reduction in shareholder equity, matching the reduction in company cash to pay for them. The company can hold the treasury stock for future reissue or retire (cancel) the shares. Upon cancellation the cost of the shares is folded into a normal equity account, such as retained earnings or additional paid capital, and ceases to appear on the balance sheet.

== Accounting for treasury stock ==
On the balance sheet, treasury stock is listed under shareholders' equity as a negative number. It is commonly called "treasury stock" or "equity reduction". That is, treasury stock is a contra account to shareholders' equity.

One way of accounting for treasury stock is with the cost method. In this method, the paid-in capital account is reduced in the balance sheet when the treasury stock is bought. When the treasury stock is sold back on the open market, the paid-in capital is debited if it is sold for less than the initial cost respectively and credited if sold for more than the initial cost.

Another common way for accounting for treasury stock is the par value method. In the par value method, when the stock is purchased back from the market, the books will reflect the action as a retirement of the shares. Therefore, common stock is debited and treasury stock is credited. However, when the treasury stock is resold back to the market the entry in the books will be the same as the cost method.

In either method, any transaction involving treasury stock cannot increase the amount of retained earnings. If the treasury stock is sold for more than cost, then the paid-in capital treasury stock is the account that is increased, not retained earnings. In auditing financial statements, it is a common practice to check for this error to detect possible attempts to "cook the books".

== United States regulations ==
In the United States, buybacks are covered by multiple laws under the auspices of the Securities and Exchange Commission.

== United Kingdom regulations ==
In the UK, the Companies Act 1955 disallowed companies from holding their own shares. However, the Companies Act 1985 later repealed this.

== See also ==
- List of financial topics
- List of accounting topics
- Shares authorized
- Shares issued
- Shares outstanding
- Share capital
- Public float
- Shareholders' equity
