= Russell 3000 Index =

U.S. all-cap stock market index

Russell 3000
- Foundation: January 1, 1984; 42 years ago
- Operator: FTSE Russell
- Trading symbol: ^RUA; RUA
- Constituents: 3,023 (April 2026)
- Type: Broad market
- Market cap: US$75.6 trillion (April 2026)
- Related indices: Russell 1000 Index, Russell 2000 Index, Russell 3000E Index
- Website: www.lseg.com/en/ftse-russell/indices/russell-3000-index

Industry classification of the components of the index per the Global Industry Classification Standard as of August 11, 2026.
1. Information Technology (34.7%)
2. Financials (12.8%)
3. Communication Services (9.03%)
4. Consumer Discretionary (9.41%)
5. Health Care (9.77%)
6. Industrials (10.0%)
7. Consumer Staples (4.29%)
8. Energy (3.51%)
9. Utilities (2.05%)
10. Materials (2.19%)
11. Real Estate (2.17%)

The Russell 3000 is a stock market index tracking the stock performance of the 3,000 largest companies listed on stock exchanges in the United States. It is maintained by FTSE Russell and its components are determined via strict rules-based methodology, with an annual rebalancing in late June, the only time new entrants are added to the index.

The index is a public-float-weighted/capitalization-weighted index. The index includes approximately 98% of the total market capitalization of U.S. public companies, with an aggregate market capitalization of about $75.6 trillion as of April 30, 2026. As of April 30, 2026, the median market capitalization of the components of the index is $2.8 billion and components range in market capitalization from $146 million to $4.8 trillion.

Products linked to the Russell 3000 include index funds (exchange-traded funds and mutual funds) as well as derivatives (options and futures contracts), which are available for trading in many countries with the goal of replicating the performance of the index. Also available are modified index funds; they replicate the performance of the index with modifications such as the use of covered call strategies, equal weighting, performance buffers, leverage, inclusion of only growth or value stocks, or exclusion of certain sectors, all with the goal of changing the risk/return and yield.

== Subsets ==
Composition of the Russell 3000's market cap, as of April 30, 2026
1. Russell 1000 (Note: Computed by subtracting the market cap of the Russell 2000 from that of the Russell 3000, using data from Russell rank day in April 2026.) (95.4%): 72.1
2. Russell 2000 (4.63%): 3.5
Total market caps, in US$ trillions.

The Russell 3000 is primarily subdivided into two other indices, the large-cap Russell 1000 and the small-cap Russell 2000. Those two indices are disjoint, and combining them results in exactly the Russell 3000. As of April 30, 2025, the Russell 1000 comprised about 95% of the Russell 3000's total market capitalization, and the Russell 2000 comprised the approximate remaining 5%.

Most other indices in the Russell US series are also subsets of the Russell 3000.

== Annual returns ==
Annual returns have been as follows:

Year	Price return (excluding dividends)	Total return (including dividends)
1994	−2.48%	0.19%
1995	33.58%	36.80%
1996	19.19%	21.82%
1997	29.47%	31.78%
1998	22.32%	24.14%
1999	19.43%	20.90%
2000	−8.52%	−7.46%
2001	−12.62%	−11.46%
2002	−22.81%	−21.54%
2003	28.73%	31.06%
2004	10.08%	11.95%
2005	4.28%	6.12%
2006	13.66%	15.71%
2007	3.30%	5.14%
2008	−38.70%	−37.31%
2009	25.46%	28.34%
2010	14.75%	16.93%
2011	−0.92%	1.03%
2012	13.98%	16.42%
2013	30.95%	33.55%
2014	10.45%	12.56%
2015	−1.47%	0.48%
2016	10.42%	12.74%
2017	18.85%	21.13%
2018	−6.99%	−5.24%
2019	28.54%	31.02%
2020	18.82%	20.89%
2021	24.00%	25.66%
2022	−20.48%	−19.21%
2023	23.95%	25.96%
2024	22.15%	23.81%
2025	15.67%	17.15%

== See also ==
- S&P 1500 – US broad stock market index from S&P Dow Jones Indices
- Russell 2500 Index
- Wilshire 5000 – US total stock market index
