= Authorised capital =

Amount of share capital that a company may issue to shareholders

The authorised capital of a company, sometimes referred to as the authorised share capital, registered capital or nominal capital (particularly in the United States), is the maximum amount of share capital that the company is authorised by its constitutional documents to issue (allocate) to shareholders. Part of the authorised capital can (and frequently does) remain unissued. The authorised capital can be changed with shareholders' approval. The part of the authorised capital which has been issued to shareholders is referred to as the issued share capital of the company.

The device of the authorised capital is used to limit or control the ability of the directors to issue or allot new shares, which may have consequences in the control of a company or otherwise alter the balance of control between shareholders. Such an issue of shares to new shareholders may also shift the profit distribution balance, for example, if new shares are issued at face value and not at market value.

The requirement for a company to have a set authorised capital was abolished in Australia in 2001, and in the United Kingdom, it was abolished under the Companies Act 2006.

== See also ==
- Issued shares
- Share capital
