= Carol Loomis =

American financial journalist

Carol Junge Loomis
- Born: June 25, 1929 (age 97); Cole Camp, Missouri
- Education: Drury College, University of Missouri
- Occupations: Journalist and retired senior editor-at-large at Fortune
- Years active: 1954-2014

Carol Junge Loomis (born June 25, 1929) is an American financial journalist, who retired in 2014 as senior editor-at-large at Fortune magazine.

== Education ==
Carol Junge Loomis attended Drury College, and graduated from the University of Missouri, with a Bachelor of Journalism degree in 1951.

== Career ==
In 1966, she coined the term "hedge fund" for a hitherto little known strategy that took off as a result. That year Carol Loomis wrote an article called "The Jones Nobody Keeps Up With." Published in Fortune, Loomis' article lionized Jones and his approach. The article's opening line summarizes the results at A.W. Jones & Co.: "There are reasons to believe that the best professional money manager of investors' money these days is a quiet-spoken seldom photographed man named Alfred Winslow Jones."[14] Coining the term 'hedge fund' to describe Jones' fund, it pointed out that his hedge fund had outperformed the best mutual fund over the previous five years by 44 percent, despite its management-incentive fee. On a 10-year basis, Mr. Jones's hedge fund had beaten the top performer Dreyfus Fund by 87 percent. This led to a flurry of interest in hedge funds and within the next three years at least 130 hedge funds were started, including George Soros's Quantum Fund and Michael Steinhardt's Steinhardt Partners.[15]

In 1976, she was appointed to the Advisory Committee on Federal Consolidated Financial Statements.

In 1980, Loomis was one of six panelists at the presidential debates of Ronald Reagan and John B. Anderson.

In 2001, she convinced Warren Buffett to write an article in Fortune explaining the Buffett indicator.

She retired from Time/Fortune magazine in July 2014 after a tenure of over 60 years with the company.

Loomis was met with sexism at the Economic Club of New York, after they called Fortune to send someone to cover their black tie dinner in 1970. They refused Loomis' attendance as they "didn't allow women"; their director said he did not want "any frivolous little Smith girls looking for a free dinner and the chance to spend an evening with 1,200 men in black tie." She still went, and later sued them. It was a private club so she lost the case.

Loomis was later invited to the Economic Club and she turned down the invitation.

== Personal life ==
Carol Loomis is a "longtime friend of Warren Buffett's, the pro bono editor of his annual letter to shareholders, and a shareholder in Berkshire Hathaway." She married John Loomis, who was a partner in First Manhattan Co. They raised two children in Larchmont, New York.

== Awards ==
- 1968 John Hancock Award for Excellence in business and financial writing, national magazine writers
- 1974 Gerald Loeb Award for Magazines for "How the Terrible Two Tier Market Came to Wall Street"
- 1989 Gerald Loeb Award for Magazines for "Buyout Kings"
- 1993 Gerald M. Loeb Lifetime Achievement Award
- 2000 Women's Economic Round Table award for print journalists
- 2001 Time Inc.'s Henry R. Luce Award
- 2006 Distinguished Achievement Award, Society of American Business Editors and Writers
- 2006 Gerald Loeb Award for Magazines for "Why Carly's Big Bet Is Failing, How the HP Board KO'd Carly"

== Works ==
- "A conversation with Warren Buffett", Fortune, June 25, 2006
- "Warren Buffett's Wild Ride at Salomon", October 27, 1997 (website of the Los Angeles Chinese Learning Center)
- "The 15% Delusion", Fortune, February 5, 2001 (website of a McDonough School of Business faculty member)
- Tap Dancing to Work: Warren Buffett on Practically Everything, 1966-2012, Portfolio, 2012, ISBN 9781101601501

== See also ==
- Buffett indicator
