= Economy monetization =

National economy metric

The economy monetization is a metric of the national economy, reflecting its saturation with liquid assets. The level of monetization is determined both by the development of the national financial system and by the whole economy. The monetization of economy also determines the freedom of capital movement. Economists have long recognized the important role played by the money supply. Nevertheless, only approximately 50 years ago did Milton Friedman convincingly prove that a change in the money quantity might have a very serious effect on the GDP. The monetization is especially important in low- to middle-income countries in which it is substantially correlated with the per-capita GDP and real interest rates. This fact suggests that supporting an upward monetization trend can be an important policy objective for governments.

The reverse concept is called economy demonetization.

== Monetization coefficient ==
The monetization coefficient (or ratio) of the economy is an indicator that is equal to the ratio of the money supply aggregate M2 to the gross domestic product (GDP)—both nominated in current prices. The coefficient reflects the proportion of the total of goods and services of an economy that is monetized—being actually paid for in money by the purchaser—to substitute bartering. This is one of the most important characteristics of the level and course of economic development. The ratio can be as low as 10–20% for the emerging economies and as high as 100%+ for the developed countries.

=== Formula ===
$\mbox{Monetization coefficient} = \frac{\mbox{M2}}{\mbox{GDP}}$

The ratio is, in fact, based on the money demand function of Milton Friedman.

This coefficient gives an idea of the degree of financial security of the economy. Many scientific publications calculate not only the indicator of M2/GDP but also M3/GDP and M1/GDP. The higher the M3/GDP compared to M1/GDP, the more developed and elaborated the system of non-cash payments and the financial potential of the economy. A small difference indicates that in this country a significant proportion of monetary transactions are carried out in cash, and the banking system is poorly developed. It is impossible to artificially increase the monetization coefficient; its growth is based on the high level of savings within the national financial system and on the strengthened confidence in the national economic policy and economic growth. The ability of the state to borrow money in the domestic market and implement social programs depends on the value of the coefficient.

The monetization ratio is positively related to the expected wealth and negatively related to the opportunity costs of holding money. A high level of economy monetization is typical for developed countries with a well-functioning financial sector. A low level of monetization creates an artificial shortage of capital and, consequently, investments. This fact limits any economic growth. At the same time, the saturation of the economy with money in an undeveloped financial system will only lead to an increase in inflation and, accordingly, an even greater decrease in the economy monetization. This is so due to the fact that the additional money supply enters the consumer market, increasing the aggregate demand, but does not proportionally affect the level of supply.

=== Criticism ===
- There is a certain paradox associated with the difference between the nominal and real money supply. The uncontrolled monetary emission does not lead to an increase in the economy monetization—but to its decrease. The rapid increase of the nominal money supply during the period of high inflation leads to an increase in prices and, accordingly, in the nominal GDP, which outstrips the increase in the amount of money, which accordingly leads to a decrease in the monetization coefficient. In contrast, a decrease in the growth rate of the nominal money supply coupled with a growing GDP increases confidence in the national currency, leading to an increase in the economy monetization.
- The GDP tends to change in a linear manner whereas the money supply may change exponentially. This fact may distort the real situation.
- For developed countries the relationship between growth in the money supply and the economic performance may become weak.
- Methods to calculate both GDP and M2 may vary from country to country, sometimes making a direct comparison between ratios troublesome.
- The money supply is measured on a specific date whereas the GDP is calculated for a specific period of time (year).

== Economy demonetization ==
There are two primary nonmonetized sectors in the economy: subsistence and barter. Modern economic publications define the economy demonetization as an increase in the share of barter in the economic life and its displacement of money as a medium of exchange. Demonetization, as a transition from monetary to barter exchange, oftentimes occurs during the periods of military operations and hyperinflation, that is, when money loses its natural role in the economy as a measure of value, means of circulation, accumulation, payment. Counterintuitively, the demonetization can also be observed in the peacetime, in the absence of the hyperinflation.

The microeconomic explanation of demonetization is the hypothesis of so-called "liquidity constraints". When entrepreneurs simply do not have enough money to carry out the necessary transactions, they have to resort to the commodity-for-commodity form of exchange. It is noted that in the context of financial crises the demonetization is associated with a strict state monetary policy. The monetary tightening (higher taxes, lower government spending, a reduction in the money supply to prevent inflation, etc.) leads to a relative stabilization of the financial sector, which, due to a decrease in liquidity, leads to the demonetization of the economy and exacerbates the production crisis. The monetary easing, in turn, exacerbates the financial crisis. Alternative explanations suggest that the demonetization can be a form of tax evasion.

== Monetization coefficients for countries (2015–2018, %) ==
The table includes data for both developed and emerging economies.

Country	2015	2016	2017	2018
US	68.52	71.37	71.88	70.77
UK	48.36	63.83	69.40	64.31
Germany	85.69	87.96	88.51	89.06
Japan	173.04	177.77	181.29	184.87
Brazil	33.17	41.84	37.97	39.35
India	18.04	13.51	17.89	18.00
China	194.18	199.30	212.16	198.04
Russia	39.41	42.36	43.55	43.22

== See also ==
- The Buffett indicator, a valuation multiple used to assess how expensive or cheap the aggregate stock market is at a given point in time by compares the capitalization of the US Wilshire 5000 index to the US GDP.
- Complementary currency
- Debt monetization
- Money multiplier
- Non-monetary economy
