= Warren Buffett =

American investor and philanthropist (born 1930)

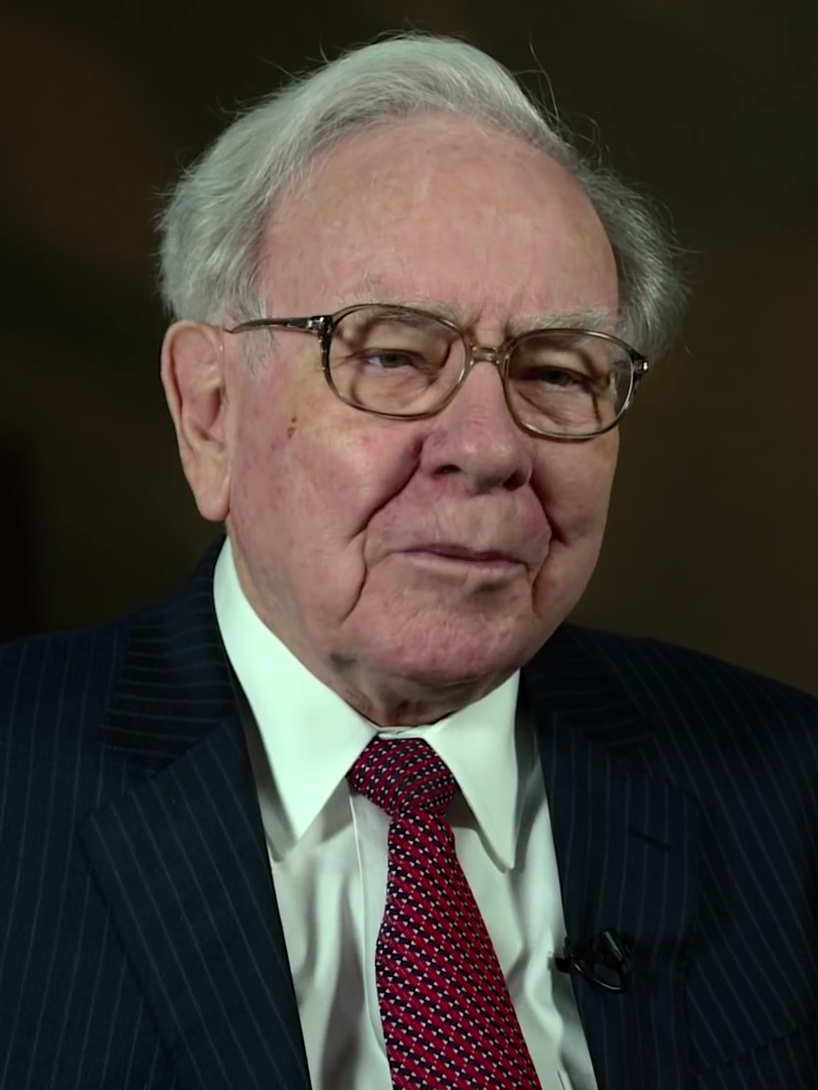
- Buffett in 2015
- Born: Warren Edward Buffett; August 30, 1930 (age 96); Omaha, Nebraska, U.S.
- Education: University of Pennsylvania (attended); University of Nebraska (BS); Columbia University (MS)
- Occupations: Business executive; investment manager
- Years active: 1951–present
- Political party: Independent
- Spouses: Susan Thompson Buffett (m. 1952; died 2004) Astrid Menks Buffett (m. 2006)
- Children: Susan Alice; Howard Graham; Peter Andrew
- Father: Howard Buffett
- Relatives: Howard Warren Buffett (grandson); Doris Buffett (sister); George Buffett (cousin)
- Website: berkshirehathaway.com

Warren Edward Buffett (/ˈbʌfɪt/ BUFF-it; born August 30, 1930) is an American investor and philanthropist who is the chairman emeritus and former CEO of the conglomerate Berkshire Hathaway. As a result of his success, Buffett is one of the best-known investors in the world. According to Forbes, as of January 2026, Buffett's estimated net worth stood at US$148.9 billion, making him the ninth-richest person in the world.

Buffett was born in Omaha, Nebraska. The son of U.S. congressman and businessman Howard Buffett, he developed an interest in business and investing during his youth. He entered the Wharton School of the University of Pennsylvania in 1947 before graduating from the University of Nebraska in Lincoln at 20. He went on to graduate from Columbia Business School, where he molded his investment approach around the concept of value investing pioneered by Benjamin Graham. He attended New York Institute of Finance to focus on his economics background and soon pursued a business career.

He then began several business ventures and investment partnerships, including one with Graham. He created Buffett Partnership Ltd. in 1956 and his investment firm eventually acquired textile manufacturer Berkshire Hathaway, applying its name to a diversified holding company. Buffett emerged as the company's chairman and majority shareholder in 1970. In 1978, fellow investor and long-time business associate Charlie Munger joined Buffett as vice-chairman.

From 1970 to 2026, Buffett presided as the chairman and largest shareholder of Berkshire Hathaway, one of America's foremost holding companies and world's leading corporate conglomerates. He has been referred to as the "Oracle" or "Sage" of Omaha by global media as a result of having accumulated a massive fortune derived from his business and investment success. Buffett adheres to the principles of value investing and frugality despite his wealth. Buffett met Chuck Feeney and has pledged to give away 99 percent of his fortune to philanthropic causes; until 2026 his giving was primarily to the Gates Foundation. He founded The Giving Pledge in 2010, with Bill Gates and Melinda French Gates, whereby billionaires pledge to give away at least half of their fortunes.

== Early life and education ==
Buffett was born on August 30, 1930, in Omaha, Nebraska, as the second of three children and the only son of Congressman Howard Buffett and his wife, Leila (née Stahl) Buffett. He began his education at Rose Hill Elementary School. In 1942, his father was elected to the first of four terms in the United States Congress, and after moving with his family to Washington, D.C., Warren finished elementary school, attended Alice Deal Junior High School and graduated from what was then Woodrow Wilson High School in 1947, where his senior yearbook picture reads: "likes math; a future stockbroker". After finishing high school and finding success with his side entrepreneurial and investment ventures, Buffett wanted to skip college to go directly into business but was overruled by his father.

Buffett showcased an interest in business and investing at a young age. He was inspired by a book he borrowed from the Omaha public library at age seven, One Thousand Ways to Make $1000. Much of Buffett's early childhood years were enlivened with entrepreneurial ventures. In one of his first business ventures, Buffett sold chewing gum, Coca-Cola, and weekly magazines door to door. He worked in his grandfather's grocery store. During his high school years, he also made money delivering newspapers, selling golf balls and stamps, and detailing cars, among other means.

On his first income tax return in 1944, Buffett took a $35 deduction (equivalent to $640 in 2025) for the use of his bicycle and watch on his paper route. In 1945, as a high school sophomore, Buffett and a friend spent $25 (equivalent to $447 in 2025) to purchase a used pinball machine, which they placed in the local barber shop. Within months, they owned several machines in three different barber shops across Omaha. In 1947 they sold the business to a war veteran for $1,200 (equivalent to $17,303 in 2025).

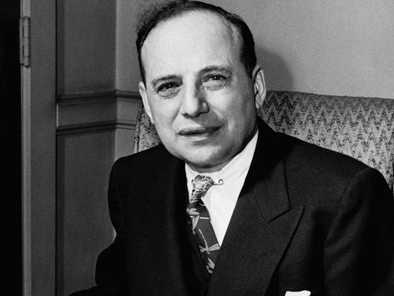
Investor Benjamin Graham (pictured) was a major influential figure on the young Warren Buffett.

Buffett's interest in the stock market and investing dates back to his schoolboy days spent in the customers' lounge of a regional stock brokerage near his father's own brokerage office. His father took interest in cultivating and educating the young Warren's curiosity surrounding the subject of business and investing, even at one point taking him to visit the New York Stock Exchange when he was 10. At 11, he bought three shares of Cities Service Preferred for himself, and three for his sister Doris Buffett (who also became a philanthropist).

At 15, Warren made more than $175 monthly (equivalent to $3,130 in 2025) delivering Washington Post newspapers. In high school, he invested in a business owned by his father and bought a 40-acre farm worked by a tenant farmer. He bought the land when he was 14 years old with $1,200 (equivalent to $21,947 in 2025) of his savings. By the time he graduated from college, Buffett had amassed $9,800 in savings (equivalent to $132,608 in 2025).

In 1947, Buffett matriculated at the Wharton School of the University of Pennsylvania. He would have preferred to focus on his business ventures, but enrolled due to pressure from his father. Warren studied there for two years and joined the Alpha Sigma Phi fraternity. He then transferred to the University of Nebraska where he graduated with a Bachelor of Science in business administration with major in Investment management in 1951. After being rejected by Harvard Business School in the spring of 1950, Buffett enrolled at Columbia Business School of Columbia University upon learning that Benjamin Graham taught there. He earned a Master of Science in Economics from Columbia in 1951. After graduating, Buffett attended the New York Institute of Finance.

The basic ideas of investing are to look at stocks as business, use the market's fluctuations to your advantage, and seek a margin of safety. That's what Ben Graham taught us. A hundred years from now they will still be the cornerstones of investing.

— Warren Buffett

== Business career ==
=== Early business career ===
Buffett worked from 1951 to 1954 at his father's firm, Buffett-Falk & Co., as an investment salesman; from 1954 to 1956 at Graham-Newman Corp. as a securities analyst; from 1956 to 1969 at several investment partnerships as the general partner; and from 1970 as chairman and CEO of Berkshire Hathaway Inc.

In 1951, Buffett discovered that Graham was on the board of GEICO insurance. Taking a train to Washington, D.C., on a Saturday, he knocked on the door of GEICO's headquarters until a janitor admitted him. There he met Lorimer Davidson, GEICO's vice president, and the two discussed the insurance business for hours, and Buffett made his first purchase of GEICO stock. Davidson would eventually become Buffett's lifelong friend and a lasting influence, and would later recall that he found Buffett to be an "extraordinary man" after only fifteen minutes. Buffett wanted to work on Wall Street but both his father and Ben Graham urged him not to. He offered to work for Graham for free, but Graham refused.

Buffett returned to Omaha and worked as a stockbroker while taking a Dale Carnegie public speaking course. Using what he learned, he felt confident enough to teach an "Investment Principles" night class at the University of Nebraska-Omaha. The average age of his students was more than twice his own. During this time he also purchased a Sinclair gas station as a side investment but it was unsuccessful.

In 1954, Buffett accepted a job at Benjamin Graham's partnership. His starting salary was $12,000 a year (equivalent to $143,866 in 2025). There he worked closely with Walter Schloss. Graham was adamant that stock picks should provide a wide margin of safety after weighing the trade-off between their price and their intrinsic value. In 1956, Benjamin Graham retired and closed his partnership. At this time Buffett, who had amassed personal savings over $174,000 (equivalent to $2,060,526 in 2025), decided to return to Omaha, where he would quickly start a series of investment partnerships.

In 1957, Buffett operated three investment partnerships. By 1959, the total had grown to six partnerships. That summer, Buffett was introduced to his future partner Charlie Munger during a business luncheon at The Omaha Club. In 1961, Buffett revealed that 35% of the partnership's assets were invested in the Sanborn Map Company. He explained that Sanborn stock sold for only $45 per share in 1958 (equivalent to $502 in 2025), but the company's investment portfolio was worth $65 per share (equivalent to $725 in 2025). This meant that Sanborn's map business was being valued at "minus $20". Buffett eventually purchased 23% of the company's outstanding shares as an activist investor, obtaining a seat for himself on the board of directors, and allied with other dissatisfied shareholders to control 44% of the shares. To avoid a proxy fight, the board offered to repurchase shares at fair value, paying with a portion of its investment portfolio. 77% of the outstanding shares were turned in. Buffett reaped a 50 percent return on investment in just two years.

=== Assuming Berkshire ===
In 1962, Buffett became a millionaire with the success of his partnerships, which by then had grown to 11 entities and held nearly $7.2 million (equivalent to $76,633,663 in 2025), of which more than $1,025,000 (equivalent to $10,910,000 in 2025) belonged to Buffett. At the start of the year, he merged the various partnerships into the single entity Buffett Partnership, Ltd., which would be his primary investment vehicle for the remainder of the decade. Buffett invested in and eventually took control of a textile manufacturing company, Berkshire Hathaway. He began buying shares in Berkshire from Seabury Stanton, the owner, who quit due to policy disagreements with the new majority shareholder. Buffett's partnerships began purchasing shares at $7.60 per share (equivalent to $81 in 2025). In 1965, when Buffett's partnerships began purchasing Berkshire aggressively, they paid $14.86 per share (equivalent to $152 in 2025) while the company had working capital of $19 per share (equivalent to $194 in 2025). This did not include the value of fixed assets (factory and equipment). Buffett took control of Berkshire Hathaway at a board meeting and named a new president, Ken Chace, to run the company. In 1966, Buffett closed the partnership to new money. He later claimed that the textile business had been his worst trade. He then moved the business into the insurance sector, and, in 1985, the last of the mills that had been the core business of Berkshire Hathaway was sold.

In a second letter, Buffett announced his first investment in a private business – Hochschild, Kohn and Co, a privately owned Baltimore department store. In 1967, Berkshire paid out its first and only dividend of 10 cents. In 1969, Buffett liquidated the partnership and transferred their assets to his partners including shares of Berkshire Hathaway. In 1970, Buffet became the chairman of Berkshire Hathaway's board of directors and wrote the first of his annual letter to shareholders. He lived solely on his salary of $50,000 per year (equivalent to $438,975 in 2025) and his outside investment income.

In 1973, Berkshire began to acquire stock in the Washington Post Company. Buffett became close friends with Katharine Graham, who controlled the company and its flagship newspaper and joined its board. In 1974, the SEC opened a formal investigation into Buffett and Berkshire's acquisition of Wesco Financial, due to possible conflict of interest. No charges were brought. In 1977, Berkshire indirectly purchased the Buffalo Evening News for $32.5 million (equivalent to $172,672,982 in 2025). Antitrust charges started, instigated by its rival, the Buffalo Courier-Express. Both papers lost money until the Courier-Express folded in 1982.

In 1979, Berkshire began to acquire stock in ABC. Capital Cities announced a $3.5 billion (equivalent to $1.5526134801×10^{10} in 2025) purchase of ABC on March 18, 1985, surprising the media industry, as ABC was four times bigger than Capital Cities at the time. Buffett helped finance the deal in return for a 25% stake in the combined company. The newly merged company, known as Capital Cities/ABC (or CapCities/ABC), was forced to sell some stations due to Federal Communications Commission ownership rules. The two companies also owned several radio stations in the same markets. Buffet's net worth passed one billion dollars in 1985.

In 1987, Berkshire Hathaway purchased a 12% stake in Salomon Inc., making it the largest shareholder and Buffett a director. In 1990, a scandal involving John Gutfreund (former CEO of Salomon Brothers) surfaced. A rogue trader, Paul Mozer, was submitting bids in excess of what was allowed by Treasury rules. When this was brought to Gutfreund's attention, he did not immediately suspend the rogue trader. Gutfreund left the company in August 1991. Buffett became chairman of Salomon until the crisis passed. In 1988, Buffett began buying The Coca-Cola Company stock, eventually purchasing up to 7% of the company for $1.02 billion (equivalent to $2.776730445×10^{9} in 2025). It would turn out to be one of Berkshire's most lucrative investments and one which it still holds.

=== As a billionaire ===
In 1998, Buffett acquired General Re (Gen Re) as a subsidiary in a deal that presented difficulties – according to the Rational Walk investment website, "underwriting standards proved to be inadequate", while a "problematic derivatives book" was resolved after numerous years and a significant loss. Gen Re later provided reinsurance after Buffett became involved with Maurice R. Greenberg at AIG in 2002.

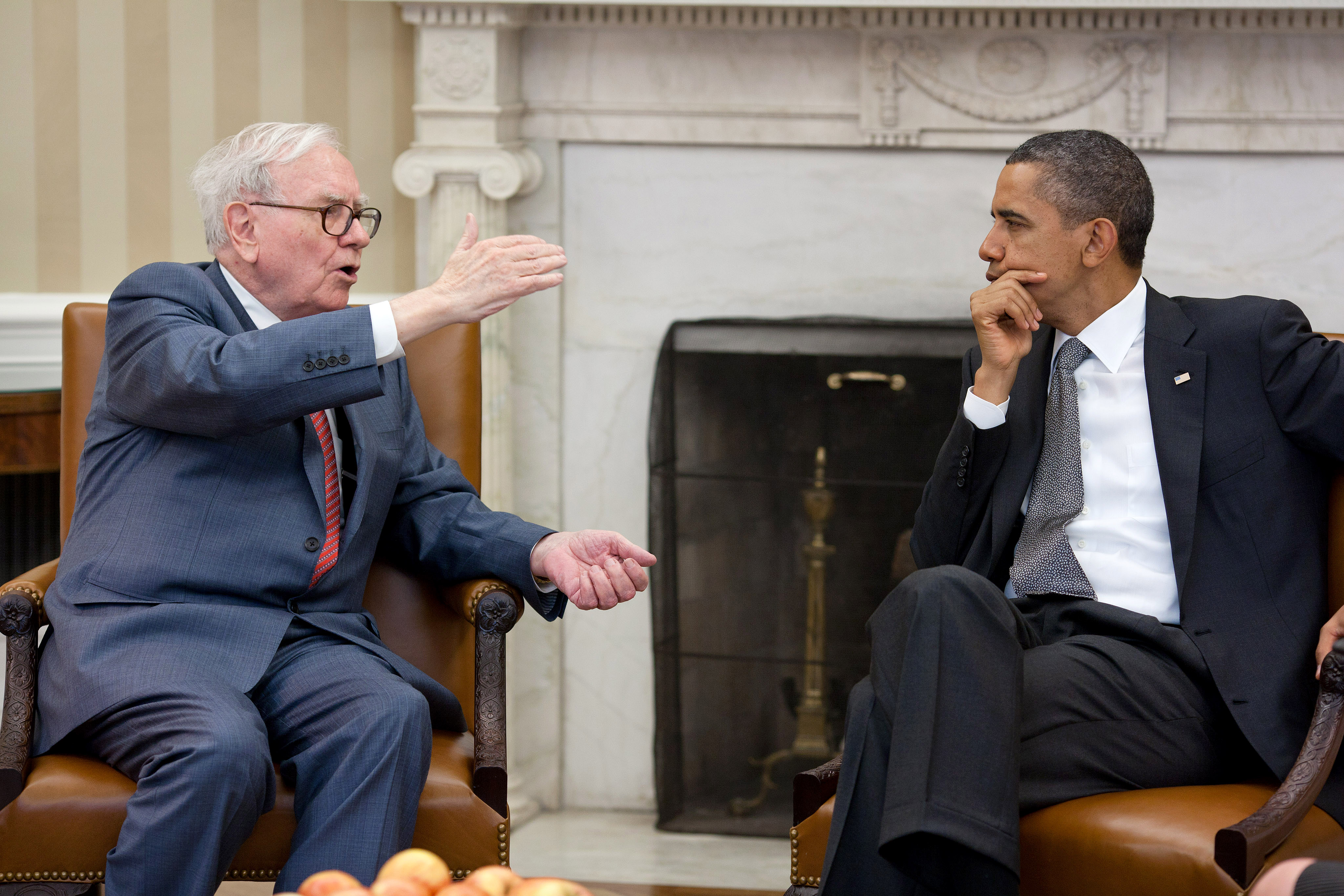
With President Barack Obama at the White House in July 2011

During a 2005 investigation of an accounting fraud case involving AIG, Gen Re executives became implicated. On March 15, 2005, the AIG board forced Greenberg to resign from his post as chairman and CEO after New York state regulators claimed that AIG had engaged in questionable transactions and improper accounting. On February 9, 2006, AIG agreed to pay a $1.6 billion fine (equivalent to $2.555298778×10^{9} in 2025).

In 2010, the U.S. government agreed to a $92 million (equivalent to $135,830,917 in 2025) settlement with Gen Re, allowing the Berkshire Hathaway subsidiary to avoid prosecution in the AIG case. Gen Re also made a commitment to implement "corporate governance concessions", which required Berkshire Hathaway's chief financial officer to attend General Re's audit committee meetings and mandated the appointment of an independent director.

In 2002, Buffett entered in $11 billion (equivalent to $1.9690101758×10^{10} in 2025) worth of forward contracts to deliver U.S. dollars against other currencies. By April 2006, his total gain on these contracts was over $2 billion (equivalent to $1.7567679102×10^{10} in 2025). Buffett announced in June 2006 that he would gradually give away 85% of his Berkshire holdings to five foundations in annual gifts of stock, starting in July 2006—the largest contribution going to the Bill and Melinda Gates Foundation. In 2007, in a letter to shareholders, Buffett announced that he was looking for a younger successor, or perhaps successors, to run his investment business.

=== 2007–08 financial crisis ===
Buffett ran into criticism during the subprime mortgage crisis of 2007 and 2008, part of the Great Recession starting in 2007, that he had allocated capital too early resulting in suboptimal deals. "Buy American. I am." he wrote for an opinion piece published in the New York Times in 2008. Buffett called the downturn in the financial sector that started in 2007 "poetic justice". Buffett's Berkshire Hathaway suffered a 77% drop in earnings during Q3 2008 and several of his later deals suffered large mark-to-market losses.

On September 23, 2008, Berkshire Hathaway acquired 10 percent of perpetual preferred stock of Goldman Sachs. Some of Buffett's put options (European exercise at expiry only) that he wrote (sold) were running at around $6.73 (equivalent to $1.0063794436×10^{10} in 2025) billion mark-to-market losses as of late 2008. The scale of the potential loss prompted the SEC to demand that Berkshire produce, "a more robust disclosure" of factors used to value the contracts. Buffett also helped Dow Chemical pay for its $18.8 billion (equivalent to $2.8112828439×10^{10} in 2025) takeover of Rohm & Haas. He thus became the single largest shareholder in the enlarged group with his Berkshire Hathaway, which provided $3 billion (equivalent to $4.486089645×10^{9} in 2025), underlining his instrumental role during the crisis in debt and equity markets.

In 2008, Buffett became the richest person in the world, garnering a total net worth estimated at $62 billion (equivalent to $9.2712519320×10^{10} in 2025) by Forbes and at $58 billion (equivalent to $8.6731066461×10^{10} in 2025) by Yahoo, dethroning Bill Gates, who had been number one on the Forbes list for 13 consecutive years. In 2009, Gates regained the top position on the Forbes list, with Buffett shifted to second place. Both of the men's values dropped, to $40 billion (equivalent to $6.0027919963×10^{10} in 2025) and $37 billion (equivalent to $5.5525825966×10^{10} in 2025) respectively—according to Forbes, Buffett lost $25 billion (equivalent to $3.7517449977×10^{10} in 2025) over a 12-month period during 2008/2009.

In October 2008, the media reported that Buffett had agreed to buy General Electric (GE) preferred stock. The operation included special incentives: he received an option to buy three billion shares of GE stock, at $22.25 (equivalent to $33 in 2025), over the five years following the agreement, and Buffett also received a 10% dividend (callable within three years). In February 2009, Buffett sold some Procter & Gamble Co. and Johnson & Johnson shares from his personal portfolio. In addition to suggestions of mistiming, the wisdom in keeping some of Berkshire's major holdings, including The Coca-Cola Company, which in 1998 peaked at $86 (equivalent to $170 in 2025), raised questions. Buffett discussed the difficulties of knowing when to sell in the company's 2004 annual report:

That may seem easy to do when one looks through an always-clean, rear-view mirror. Unfortunately, however, it's the windshield through which investors must peer, and that glass is invariably fogged.

In March 2009, Buffett said in a cable television interview that the economy had "fallen off a cliff ... Not only has the economy slowed down a lot, but people have really changed their habits like I haven't seen". Additionally, Buffett feared that inflation levels that occurred in the 1970s—which led to years of painful stagflation—might re-emerge.

=== A capitalized Berkshire ===
In 2009, Buffett invested $2.6 billion (equivalent to $3.901814798×10^{9} in 2025) as a part of Swiss Re's campaign to raise equity capital. Berkshire Hathaway already owned a 3% stake, with rights to own more than 20%. Also in 2009, Buffett acquired Burlington Northern Santa Fe Corp. for $34 billion (equivalent to $5.1023731968×10^{10} in 2025) in cash and stock. Alice Schroeder, author of Snowball, said that a key reason for the purchase was to diversify Berkshire Hathaway from the financial industry. Measured by market capitalization in the Financial Times Global 500, Berkshire Hathaway was the eighteenth largest corporation in the world as of June 2009.

In 2009, Buffett divested his failed investment in ConocoPhillips.

The merger with the Burlington Northern Santa Fe Railway (BNSF) closed upon BNSF shareholder approval during Q1 of 2010. This deal was valued at approximately $44 billion, with $10 billion of outstanding BNSF debt (equivalent to $7.9726842667×10^{10} in 2025) and represented an increase of the previously existing stake of 22%.

In June 2010, Buffett defended the credit-rating agencies for their role in the U.S. financial crisis, claiming:

Very, very, very few people could appreciate the bubble. That's the nature of bubbles — they become mass delusions.

On March 18, 2011, Goldman Sachs was given Federal Reserve approval to buy back Berkshire's preferred stock in Goldman. Buffett had been reluctant to give up the stock, which averaged $1.4 million (equivalent to $2,003,698 in 2025) in dividends per day, saying:

I'm going to be the Osama bin Laden of capitalism. I'm on my way to an unknown destination in Asia where I'm going to look for a cave. If the U.S. Armed forces can't find Osama bin Laden in 10 years, let Goldman Sachs try to find me.

In November 2011, it was announced that over the course of the previous eight months, Buffett had bought 64 million shares of International Business Machine Corp (IBM) stock, worth around $11 billion (equivalent to $1.5743343195×10^{10} in 2025). This unanticipated investment raised his stake in the company to around 5.5 percent—the largest stake in IBM alongside that of State Street Global Advisors. Buffett had said on numerous prior occasions that he would not invest in technology because he did not fully understand it, so the move came as a surprise to many investors and observers. During the interview, in which he revealed the investment to the public, Buffett stated that he was impressed by the company's ability to retain corporate clients and said, "I don't know of any large company that really has been as specific on what they intend to do and how they intend to do it as IBM".

In May 2012, Buffett's acquisition of Media General, consisting of 63 newspapers in the south-eastern U.S., was announced. The company was the second news print purchase made by Buffett in one year. Interim publisher James W. Hopson announced on July 18, 2013, that the Press of Atlantic City would be sold to Buffett's BH Media Group by ABARTA, a private holding company based in Pittsburgh, U.S. At the Berkshire shareholders meeting in May 2013, Buffett explained that he did not expect to "move the needle" at Berkshire with newspaper acquisitions, but he anticipates an annual return of 10 percent. The Press of Atlantic City became Berkshire's 30th daily newspaper, following other purchases such as Virginia, U.S.' Roanoke Times and The Tulsa World in Oklahoma, U.S.

After the difficulties of the economic crisis, Buffett managed to bring its company back to its pre-recession standards: in Q2 2014, Berkshire Hathaway made $6.4 billion (equivalent to $8.703964015×10^{9} in 2025) in net profit, the most it had ever made in a three-month period. On August 14, 2014, the price of Berkshire Hathaway's shares hit $200,000 a share (equivalent to $271,999 in 2025) for the first time, capitalizing the company at $328 billion (equivalent to $4.46078155749×10^{11} in 2025). While Buffett had given away much of his stock to charities by this time, he still held 321,000 shares worth $64.2 billion (equivalent to $8.7311639022×10^{10} in 2025). On August 20, 2014, Berkshire Hathaway was fined $896,000 (equivalent to $1,218,555 in 2025) for failing to report as required the December 9, 2013, purchase of shares in USG Corporation.

A 2023 ProPublica article based on a leak of confidential IRS data alleged that Buffett had made equity trades in his personal portfolio involving companies that Berkshire Hathaway bought or sold during the same quarter or the quarter before, raising concerns about conflicts of interest. On three dates between 2009 and 2012, Buffett sold shares of Johnson and Johnson, Walmart, and Wells Fargo, with the sales totaling $80 million in value (equivalent to $120,055,840 in 2025). Although Buffett has not commented, Berkshire Hathaway's Vice Chairman Charlie Munger dismissed the allegations, saying "I don't think there's the slightest chance that Warren Buffett is doing something that is deeply evil to make money for himself."

At Berkshire Hathaway's investor conference on May 3, 2025, Buffett requested that the board appoint Greg Abel to succeed him as CEO of the company by the end of the year. On May 5, 2025, the company announced the appointment of Abel as president and CEO, effective January 1, 2026, with Buffett remaining chairman. Buffett stepped down as chairman on September 18, 2026, effective immediately, with his son Howard Graham Buffett succeeding him. He remains a director of the company.

== Investment philosophy ==
Buffett's writings include his annual reports and various articles. Buffett is recognized by communicators as a great story-teller, as evidenced by his annual letters to shareholders. He has warned about the pernicious effects of inflation:

The arithmetic makes it plain that inflation is a far more devastating tax than anything that has been enacted by our legislatures. The inflation tax has a fantastic ability to simply consume capital. It makes no difference to a widow with her savings in a 5 percent passbook account whether she pays 100 percent income tax on her interest income during a period of zero inflation, or pays no income taxes during years of 5 percent inflation.

— Buffett, Fortune (1977)

In his article, "The Superinvestors of Graham-and-Doddsville", Buffett rebutted the academic efficient-market hypothesis, that beating the S&P 500 was "pure chance", by highlighting the results achieved by a number of students of the Graham and Dodd value investing school of thought. In addition to himself, Buffett named Walter J. Schloss, Tom Knapp, Ed Anderson (Tweedy, Browne LLC), William J. Ruane (Sequoia Fund), Charlie Munger (Buffett's partner at Berkshire), Rick Guerin (Pacific Partners Ltd.), and Stan Perlmeter (Perlmeter Investments). In his November 1999 Fortune article, he warned of investors' unrealistic expectations:

Let me summarize what I've been saying about the stock market: I think it's very hard to come up with a persuasive case that equities will over the next 17 years perform anything like—anything like—they've performed in the past 17. If I had to pick the most probable return, from appreciation and dividends combined, that investors in aggregate—repeat, aggregate—would earn in a world of constant interest rates, 2% inflation, and those ever hurtful frictional costs, it would be 6%!

— Buffett, Fortune (1999)

=== Index funds versus active management ===
Buffett has been a supporter of index funds for people who are either not interested in managing their own money or do not have the time. Buffett is skeptical that active management can outperform the market in the long run, and has advised both individual and institutional investors to move their money to low-cost index funds that track broad, diversified stock market indices. Buffett said in one of his letters to shareholders that "when trillions of dollars are managed by Wall Streeters charging high fees, it will usually be the managers who reap outsized profits, not the clients". In 2007, Buffett made a bet with numerous managers that a simple S&P 500 index fund will outperform hedge funds that charge exorbitant fees. By 2017, the index fund was outperforming every hedge fund that made the bet against Buffett.

=== Using investment banks ===
Buffett has a long-standing aversion to using the services of investment banks via Berkshire Hathaway. This dynamic was also reported in Barron's, Insider, and Seeking Alpha, among others.

=== Investment style ===
In his early years, Warren Buffett was influenced by Benjamin Graham who was a value investor and is known as "the father of value investing". When studying under Graham in Columbia Business School, Buffett adopted that style which was to find undervalued stocks below their intrinsic value known as "cigar butts". He believed in buying "durable competitive stocks" rather than just "cheap stocks" which he assessed by brand loyalty, strong consistent earnings, competitive advantage and pricing power in addition to holding it for long term. He came up with rules such as 1. "Never lose money", 2. "Never forget rule number 1", believing in the importance of protecting capital. He believed the ideal holding period for a stock was forever and he even said in a 1996 letter to Berkshire Hathaway shareholders "If you aren't willing to own a stock for ten years, don't even think about owning it for ten minutes".

== Personal life ==
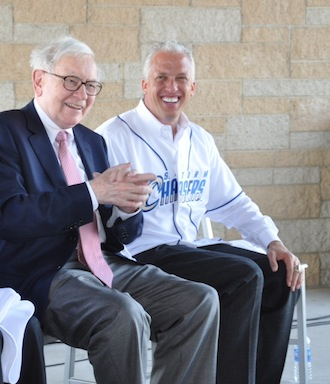
With Gary Green in 2010

In 1949, Buffett developed a crush on a young woman whose boyfriend had a ukulele. In an attempt to compete, he bought one of the instruments and has been playing it ever since. Though the attempt to capture her attention was unsuccessful, his music interest became a key part of his becoming a part of Susan Thompson's life, and led to their marriage. Buffett often plays the instrument at stockholder meetings and other opportunities. His love of the instrument led to the commissioning of two custom Dairy Queen ukuleles by Dave Talsma, one of which was auctioned for charity.

In 1952, Buffett married Susan at Dundee Presbyterian Church. The following year, they had their first child, Susan Alice. She was followed by Howard (b. 1954) and Peter (b. 1958). The couple began living separately in 1977, although they remained married until Susan's death in July 2004. Their daughter Susan lives in Omaha, is a national board member of Girls, Inc., and performs charitable work through the Susan A. Buffett Foundation.

In 2006, on his 76th birthday, Buffett married his longtime companion, Astrid Menks, who was then 60 years old—she had lived with him since his wife's departure to San Francisco in 1977. Susan had arranged for the two to meet before she left Omaha to pursue her singing career. All three were close and Christmas cards to friends were signed "Warren, Susie and Astrid". Susan briefly discussed this relationship in an interview on the Charlie Rose Show shortly before her death, in a rare glimpse into Buffett's personal life.

Buffett disowned his son Peter's adopted daughter, Nicole, in 2006 after she participated in the Jamie Johnson documentary The One Percent about the growing economic inequality between the wealthy and the average citizen in the United States. Although his first wife referred to Nicole as one of her "adored grandchildren", Buffett wrote Nicole a letter stating, "I have not emotionally or legally adopted you as a grandchild, nor have the rest of my family adopted you as a niece or a cousin". By 2022, she and Buffett had reconciled.

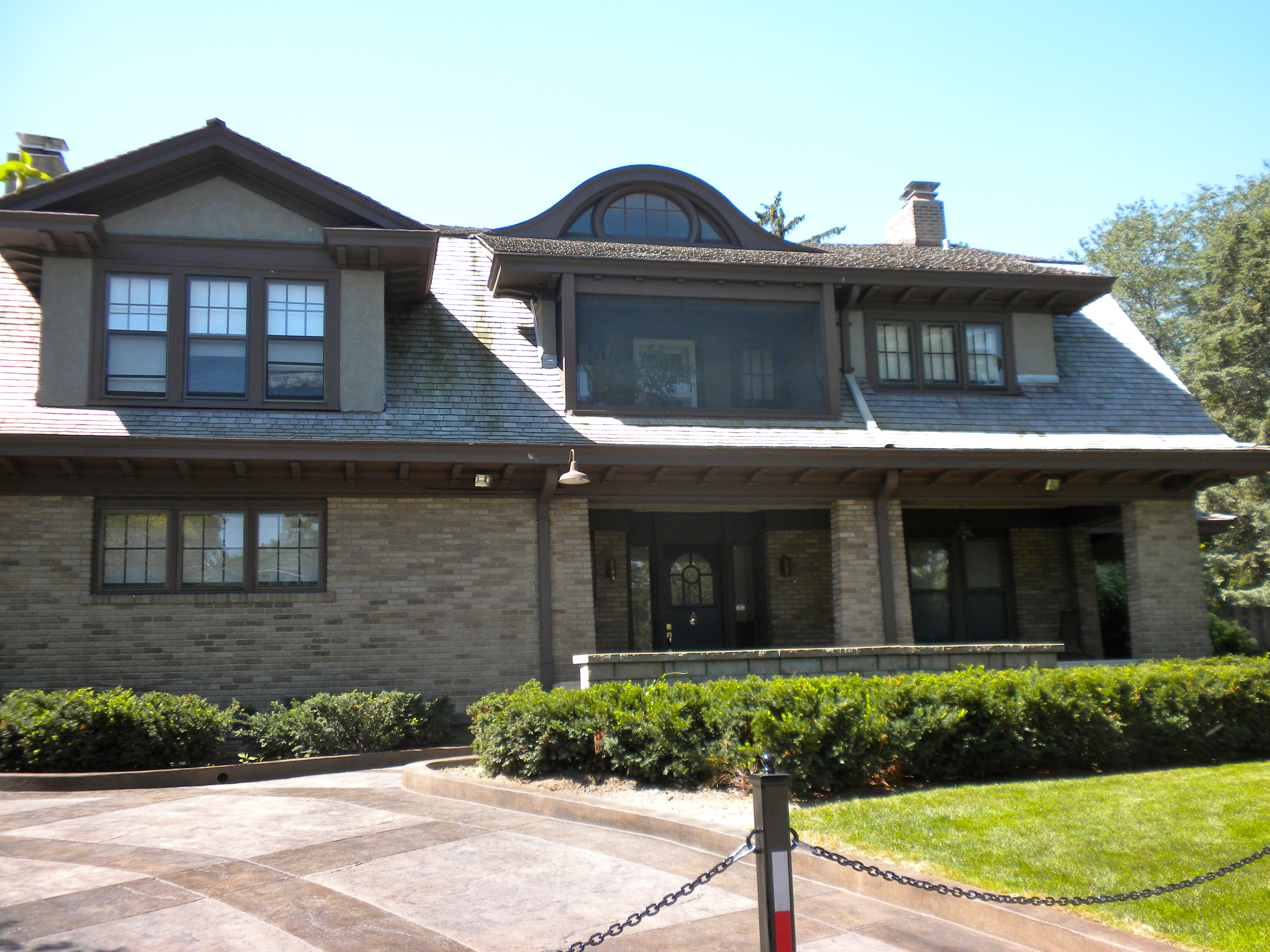
Buffett's home in Omaha, Nebraska

His 2006 annual salary was about $100,000 (equivalent to $159,706 in 2025), which is small compared to senior executive remuneration in comparable companies. In 2008, he earned a total compensation of $175,000 (equivalent to $261,689 in 2025), which included a base salary of just $100,000 (equivalent to $149,536 in 2025). In 1958, Buffett purchased a five-bedroom stucco house in Omaha, where he still lives, for US$31,500 (equivalent to $351,514 in 2025). He also owned a vacation home in Laguna Beach, California, which he purchased for $150,000 in 1971 (equivalent to $1,192,482 in 2025). He sold it for $7.5 million (equivalent to $9,616,022 in 2025) in 2018.

In 1989, after spending nearly $6.7 million (equivalent to $17,402,013 in 2025) of Berkshire's funds on a private jet, Buffett named it "The Indefensible", later renamed "The Indispensable". This act was at odds with his past condemnation of extravagant spending by other CEOs. Buffett sold the jet prior to mid-1999 and has since usually flown with Berkshire's flight services businesses.

Bridge is such a sensational game that I wouldn't mind being in jail if I had three cellmates who were decent players and who were willing to keep the game going twenty-four hours a day.

— Buffett on bridge

Buffett is an avid bridge player, which he plays with Gates and champion player Sharon Osberg; he is said to spend 12 hours a week playing the game. In 2006, he sponsored a bridge match for the Buffett Cup. Modeled on the Ryder Cup in golf—held immediately before it in the same city—the teams are chosen by invitation, with a female team and five male teams provided by each country.

When he purchased the Omaha Sun from Stanford Lipsey in 1969, Buffett volunteered to become the first non-Jewish member of Omaha's Highland Club, to set an example of nondiscrimination. According to Lipsey, at that time the Omaha Country Club did not take Jewish members, and the Highland Club had no non-Jewish members.

He is a dedicated, lifelong follower of Nebraska football, and attends as many games as his schedule permits. He supported the hire of Bo Pelini, following the 2007 season, stating, "It was getting kind of desperate around here". He watched the 2009 game against Oklahoma from the Nebraska sideline, after being named an honorary assistant coach. Buffett was elected to the American Philosophical Society in 2009. Buffett worked with Christopher Webber on an animated series called "Secret Millionaires Club" with chief Andy Heyward of DiC Entertainment. The series features Buffett and Munger and teaches children healthy financial habits.

Buffett was raised as a Presbyterian, but has since described himself as agnostic. In December 2006, it was reported that Buffett did not carry a mobile phone, did not have a computer at his desk, and drove his own automobile, a Cadillac DTS. In contrast to that, at the 2018 Berkshire Hathaway's shareholder meeting, he stated he uses Google as his preferred search engine. In 2013 he had an old Nokia flip phone and had sent one email in his entire life. In February 2020, Buffett revealed in a CNBC interview that he had traded in his flip phone for an iPhone 11. Buffett reads five newspapers every day, beginning with the Omaha World Herald, which his company acquired in 2011.

Buffett's speeches are known for mixing business discussions with humor. Each year, Buffett presides over Berkshire Hathaway's annual shareholder meeting in the Qwest Center in Omaha, Nebraska, an event drawing over 20,000 visitors from both the United States and abroad, giving it the nickname "Woodstock of Capitalism". Berkshire's annual reports and letters to shareholders, prepared by Buffett, frequently receive coverage by the financial media. Buffett's writings are known for containing quotations from sources as varied as the Bible and Mae West, as well as advice in a folksy, Midwestern style and numerous jokes.

In April 2017, Buffett (an avid Coca-Cola drinker and shareholder in the company) agreed to have his likeness placed on Cherry Coke products in China. Buffett was not compensated for this advertisement. Buffett is very distantly related to the 44th president of the United States, Barack Obama. Buffett was a longtime friend of singer-songwriter Jimmy Buffett until Jimmy's death in September 2023, and they would often refer to one another as "Uncle Warren" and "Cousin Jimmy". The two took a DNA test which revealed no relation.

=== Health ===
Buffett is a teetotaler. On April 11, 2012, Buffett was diagnosed with stage I prostate cancer during a routine test. He announced he would begin two months of daily radiation treatment from mid-July. In a letter to shareholders, Buffett said he felt "great—as if I were in my normal excellent health—and my energy level is 100 percent". On September 15, 2012, Buffett announced that he had completed the full 44-day radiation treatment cycle, saying "it's a great day for me" and "I am so glad to say that's over".

== Wealth ==
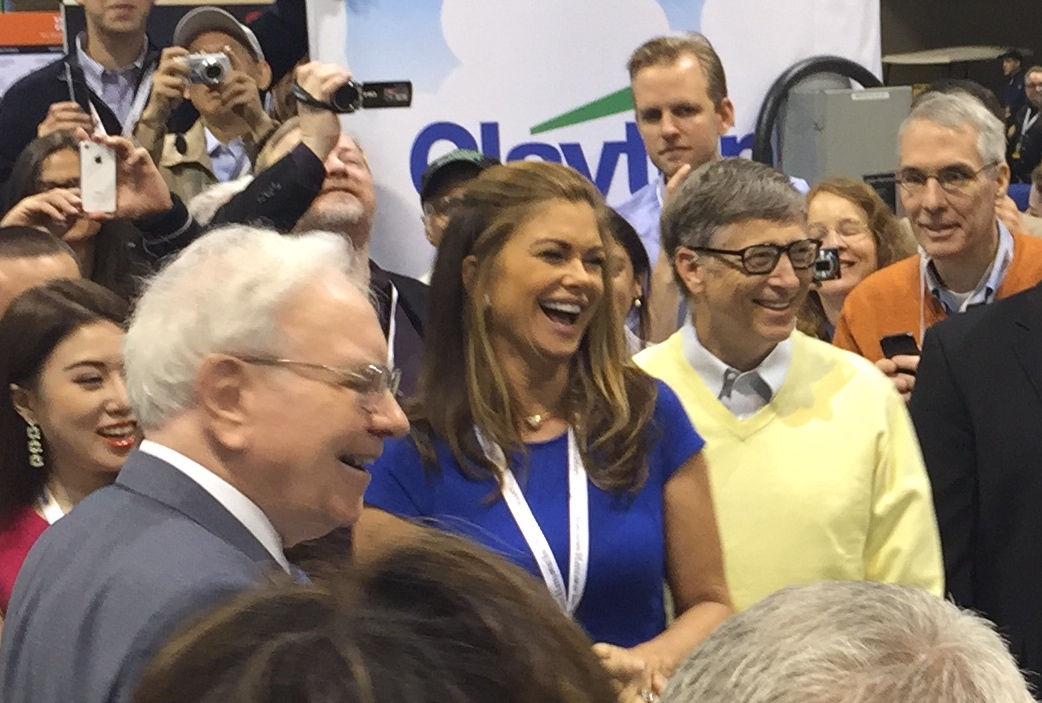
Buffett, Kathy Ireland and Bill Gates at the 2015 Berkshire Hathaway shareholders meeting

In 2008, Buffett was ranked by Forbes as the richest person in the world with an estimated net worth of approximately $62 billion (equivalent to $93 billion in 2025). In 2009, after donating billions of dollars to charity, he was ranked as the second richest man in the United States with a net worth of $37 billion (equivalent to $56 billion in 2025) with only Bill Gates ranked higher than Buffett. His net worth had risen to $58.5 billion as of September 2013 (equivalent to $81 billion in 2025).

In 1999, Buffett was named the Top Money Manager of the Twentieth Century in a survey by the Carson Group, ahead of Peter Lynch and John Templeton. In 2007, he was listed among Time's 100 Most Influential People in the world. In 2011, President Barack Obama awarded him the Presidential Medal of Freedom. Buffett, along with Bill Gates, was named the most influential global thinker in Foreign Policy's 2010 report.

Buffett has written several times of his belief that, in a market economy, the rich earn outsized rewards for their talents. His children will not inherit a significant proportion of his wealth. He once commented, "I want to give my kids just enough so that they would feel that they could do anything, but not so much that they would feel like doing nothing".

== Philanthropy ==
Buffett had long stated his intention to give away his fortune to charity, and in June 2006, he announced a new plan to give 83% of it to the Bill & Melinda Gates Foundation (BMGF). He pledged about the equivalent of 10 million Berkshire Hathaway Class B shares to the Bill & Melinda Gates Foundation (equivalent to $4.9029795312×10^{10} in 2025), making it the largest charitable donation in history, and Buffett one of the leaders of philanthrocapitalism. The foundation will receive 5% of the total each July, beginning in 2006. The pledge is conditional upon three requirements:

- Bill or Melinda Gates must be alive and active in BMGF
- BMGF must continue to qualify as a charity
- Each year BMGF must give away an amount equal to the prior year's Berkshire gift plus the additional 5% of net assets as required of all US foundations

Buffett joined the Gates Foundation's board as a founding trustee, but did not initially plan to be actively involved in the foundation's investments. Buffett announced his resignation as a trustee of the Gates Foundation on June 23, 2021. This represented a significant shift from Buffett's previous statements, to the effect that most of his fortune would pass to his Buffett Foundation. The bulk of the estate of his wife, valued at $2.6 billion (equivalent to $4.431818182×10^{9} in 2025), went there when she died in 2004. He also pledged $50 million (equivalent to $89,500,463 in 2025) to the Nuclear Threat Initiative, in Washington, where he began serving as an adviser in 2002.

In 2006, he auctioned his 2001 Lincoln Town Car on eBay to raise money for Girls, Inc. In 2007, he auctioned a luncheon with himself that raised a final bid of $650,100 (equivalent to $1,009,423 in 2025) for the Glide Foundation. Later auctions raised $2.1 million (equivalent to $3,155,216 in 2025), $1.7 million (equivalent to $2,509,919 in 2025) and $3.5 million (equivalent to $4,908,320 in 2025). The winners traditionally dine with Buffett at New York's Smith and Wollensky steak house. The restaurant donates at least $10,000 to Glide each year to host the meal.

In 2009, Ralph Nader wrote the book Only the Super Rich Can Save Us, a novel about "a movement of billionaires led by Warren Buffett and featuring, among others, Ted Turner, George Soros and Barry Diller, who use their fortunes to clean up America". On C-SPAN BookTV, Nader said Buffett invited him to breakfast after the book came out and was "quite intrigued by the book". He also told Nader of his plan to get "billionaires all over the world to donate 50% of their estate to charity or good works".

On December 9, 2010, Buffett, Bill Gates, and Facebook CEO Mark Zuckerberg signed a promise they called the "Gates-Buffett Giving Pledge", in which they promise to donate to charity at least half of their wealth, and invite other wealthy people to follow suit. In 2018, after making almost $3.4 billion donations, Buffett was ranked 3rd in the Forbes' List of Billionaires 2018.

Buffett continues to help fund and support his family's individual foundations which include Susan Buffett's Susan Thompson Buffett Foundation, Susan Alice Buffett's Sherwood Foundation, Howard Graham Buffett's Howard G. Buffett Foundation, and Peter Buffett's NoVo Foundation. Warren Buffett was also supportive of his sister Doris Buffett's Letters Foundation and Learning By Giving Foundation.

In November 2022, Buffett made a donation of $750 million (equivalent to $825,136,457 in 2025) in Berkshire Hathaway shares to four charitable foundations run by his children. 1.5 million Class B shares of his conglomerate to the Susan Thompson Buffett Foundation, named after his first wife. He also transferred 300,000 Class B shares each to three funds managed by his children: the Sherwood Foundation, the Howard G. Buffett Foundation and the NoVo Foundation. As of 2023, Buffett has given over $50 billion to charitable causes (equivalent to $5.2834207077×10^{10} in 2025).

In June 2025, Buffett donated $6 billion in Berkshire Hathaway shares to five charitable foundations. A majority of shares were donated to the Gates Foundation with the rest received by four other charitable foundations run by their children. As of June 2025, Buffett had donated over $60 billion to charitable causes. However, it was later revealed in March 2026 that Buffett has in fact had a more distant relationship with the Gates Foundation since the divorce of Bill and Melinda Gates in 2021.

In July 2026, Buffett's philanthropic foundation, The Warren Buffet Foundation, omitted The Gates Foundation from its annual giving list, due to Bill Gates' Epstein ties. Buffett, who was a founding trustee of the Gates Foundation, announced that he would cease all kinds of donations to the Gates Foundation, with records also showing that he had major no donations to the foundation in 2026, and sever his partnership with the foundation as well, with money he intended to give the foundation upon his passing instead being redirected to four family foundations run by his family.

At the time he had severed ties to the Gates Foundation, Buffet was estimated to have donated $48 billion to the foundation since developing a philanthropic partnership with it in 2006.

== Political and public policy views ==
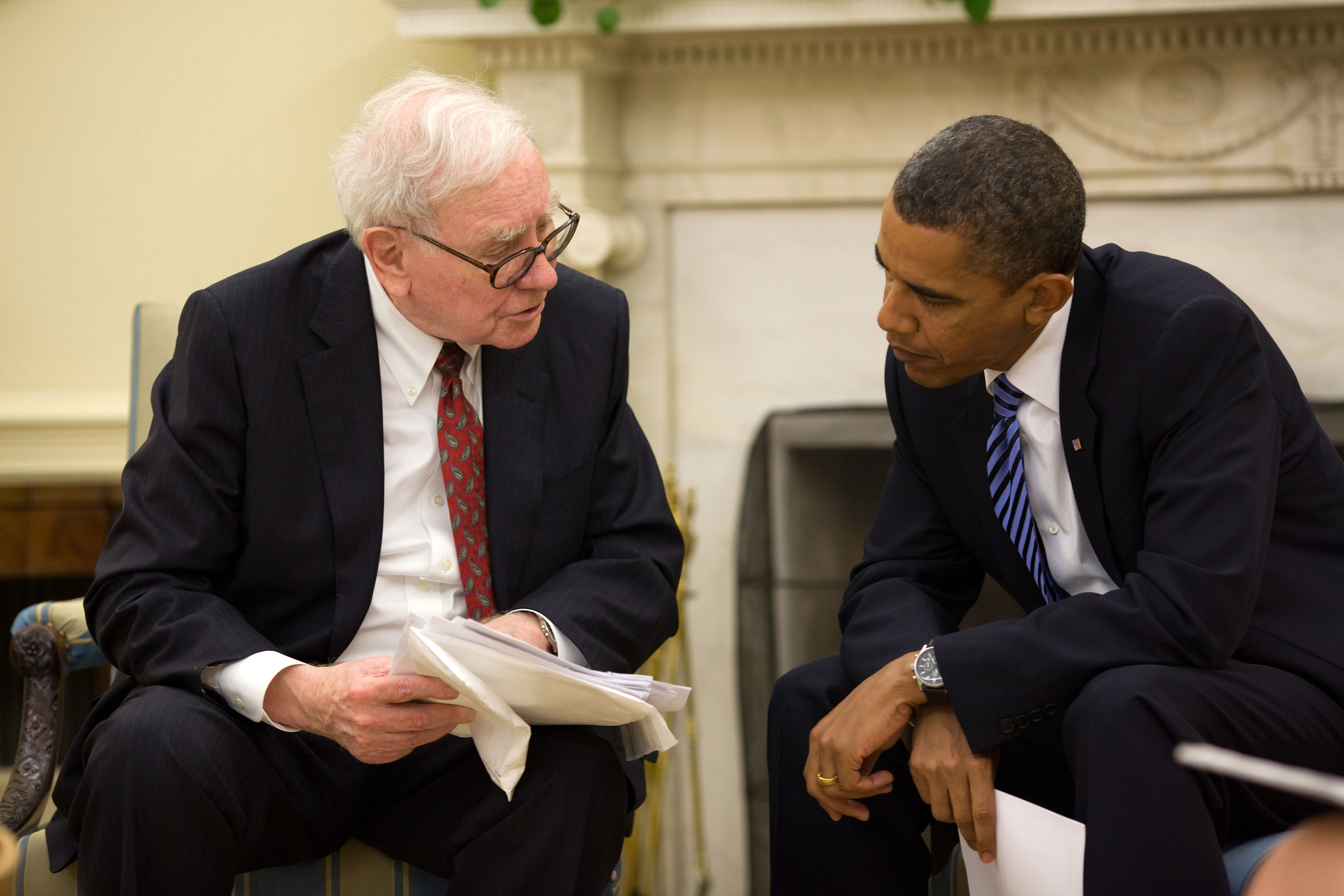
Buffett and President Obama in the Oval Office, July 14, 2010

Buffett generally does not make public statements about his political views. In 2023, journalist Roger Lowenstein described Buffett's politics as having remained internally consistent over the decades, adhering to a classical liberal viewpoint, in favor of civil rights and regulated capitalism. He left his father's Republican Party for the Democratic Party in the 1960s over civil rights, but has expressed a willingness to support candidates from either party.

In the 1990s, after passage of the 1993 Deficit Reduction Package, Buffett fundraised for and endorsed Nebraska Democrats Bob Kerrey and Peter Hoagland in their re-election efforts. He was a financial advisor to Republican candidate Arnold Schwarzenegger during the 2003 California gubernatorial election. Buffett endorsed and donated to Barack Obama's first presidential campaign, and endorsed Hillary Clinton in her 2016 presidential campaign.

=== Health care ===
Buffett described the health care reform under President Barack Obama as insufficient to deal with the costs of health care in the U.S., though he supports its aim of expanding health insurance coverage. Buffett compared health care costs to a tapeworm, saying that they compromise US economic competitiveness by increasing manufacturing costs. Buffett said in 2010 that it was not sustainable for the U.S. to devote 17% of its GDP to healthcare expenditure, noting that many other nations spent a much smaller proportion of their GDP on health expenditures, with better healthcare outcomes.

Buffett faults the incentives in the United States medical industry, that payers reimburse doctors for procedures (fee-for-service) leading to unnecessary care (overuse), instead of paying for results. Buffett raised the problem of lobbying by the medical industry, saying that they are very focused on maintaining their income.

=== Curbing population growth ===
Buffett has expressed concerns about unchecked population growth. In 2009, he met with several other billionaires to discuss healthcare, education and slowing population growth. Called "The Good Club" by an insider, the billionaires had given away $45 billion (equivalent to $5.5982383953×10^{10} in 2025 to philanthropic causes and included Oprah Winfrey, Michael Bloomberg and David Rockefeller, Jr. The meeting has drawn criticism from some right-wing blogs, with some believing the group to be a part of a secret sterilization society. Buffett is a long-time supporter of family planning. The Buffett Foundation has given over $1.5 billion (equivalent to $2.012271215×10^{9} in 2025) to abortion research to include $427 million (equivalent to $572,826,539 in 2025) to Planned Parenthood.

=== Taxes ===
President Obama announcing the "Buffett Rule"

Buffett stated that he only paid 19% of his income for 2006, or around $48.1 million (equivalent to $76,818,670 in 2025) in total federal taxes (due to their source as dividends and capital gains) while his employees paid 33% of theirs, despite making much less money. Regarding how little he pays in taxes compared to his employees, he said, "How can this be fair? How can this be right? There's class warfare, all right, but it's my class, the rich class, that's making war, and we're winning." After Donald Trump accused him of taking "massive deductions", Buffett countered, "I have copies of all 72 of my returns and none uses a carryforward."

Buffett favors the inheritance tax, saying that repealing it would be like "choosing the 2020 Olympic team by picking the eldest sons of the gold-medal winners in the 2000 Olympics". In 2007, Buffett testified before the Senate and urged them to preserve the estate tax so as to avoid a plutocracy. Some critics argued that Buffett (through Berkshire Hathaway) has a personal interest in the continuation of the estate tax, since Berkshire Hathaway benefited from the estate tax in past business dealings and had developed and marketed insurance policies to protect policy holders against future estate tax payments. Buffett believes government should not be in the business of gambling, or legalizing casinos, calling it a tax on ignorance.

=== Dollar and gold ===
The trade deficit induced Buffett to enter the foreign currency market for the first time in 2002. He substantially reduced his stake in 2005 as changing interest rates increased the costs of holding currency contracts. Buffett remained bearish on the dollar, stating that he was looking to acquire companies with substantial foreign revenues. Buffett has been critical of gold as an investment, with his critique being based primarily on its non-productive nature. In a 1998 address at Harvard, Buffett said:

It gets dug out of the ground in Africa, or someplace. Then we melt it down, dig another hole, bury it again and pay people to stand around guarding it. It has no utility. Anyone watching from Mars would be scratching their head.

In 1977, about stocks, gold, farmland and inflation, he stated:

Stocks are probably still the best of all the poor alternatives in an era of inflation—at least they are if you buy in at appropriate prices.

He has made a number of remarks about gold.

From 2020 to 2021, Berkshire Hathaway owned shares in Barrick Gold, a gold mining company.

Between July 1997 and January 1998, Berkshire Hathaway purchased 129.7 million ounces of silver.

=== Expensing of stock options ===
He has been a strong proponent of stock option expensing on corporate income statements. At the 2004 annual meeting, he lambasted a bill before the United States Congress that would consider only some company-issued stock options compensation as an expense, likening the bill to one that was almost passed by the Indiana House of Representatives to change the value of Pi from 3.14159 to 3.2 through legislative fiat.

When a company gives something of value to its employees in return for their services, it is clearly a compensation expense. And if expenses don't belong in the earnings statement, where in the world do they belong?

=== High technology ===
In May 2012, Buffett said he had avoided buying stock in high-technology companies such as Facebook and Google due to them being complex and difficult to understand on top of their concomitant complications from being hard to confidently estimate their future value. He also stated that initial public offering's (IPO) of new stock issues are almost always bad investments. Buffett has advised investors to look for companies that will have good value in ten years. However, starting in 2016 Berkshire Hathaway started buying Apple stock.

=== Bitcoin and cryptocurrencies ===
In an interview with CNBC in January 2018, Buffett said the recent craze over Bitcoin and other cryptocurrencies would not end well, adding that "when it happens or how or anything else, I don't know;" and later that year calling it, "rat poison squared." But he also said he would not take a short position on bitcoin futures.

=== COVID-19 pandemic ===
In a June 2021 interview with CNBC, Buffett said that the economic impact of the COVID-19 pandemic has increased economic inequality and bemoaned that most people are unaware that "hundreds of thousands or millions" of small businesses have been negatively impacted. He also stated that the markets and the economy will likely be unpredictable well into the post-pandemic recovery period, even with the Biden administration and the United States Federal Reserve having a plan in place. He said the unpredictability and the effects of COVID-19 are far from over.

== Film and television ==
Aside from countless television appearances on various news programs (Adam Smith's Money World in 1985 reportedly being the first), Buffett has appeared in numerous films and TV programs, both documentary, and fiction. Some film and television cameos he has made include Wall Street: Money Never Sleeps (2010), The Office (U.S.), All My Children, and Entourage (2015). He has been a guest 10 times on Charlie Rose, and was the subject of the HBO documentary feature Becoming Warren Buffett (2017) and the BBC production The World's Greatest Money Maker (2009).

== Bibliography ==
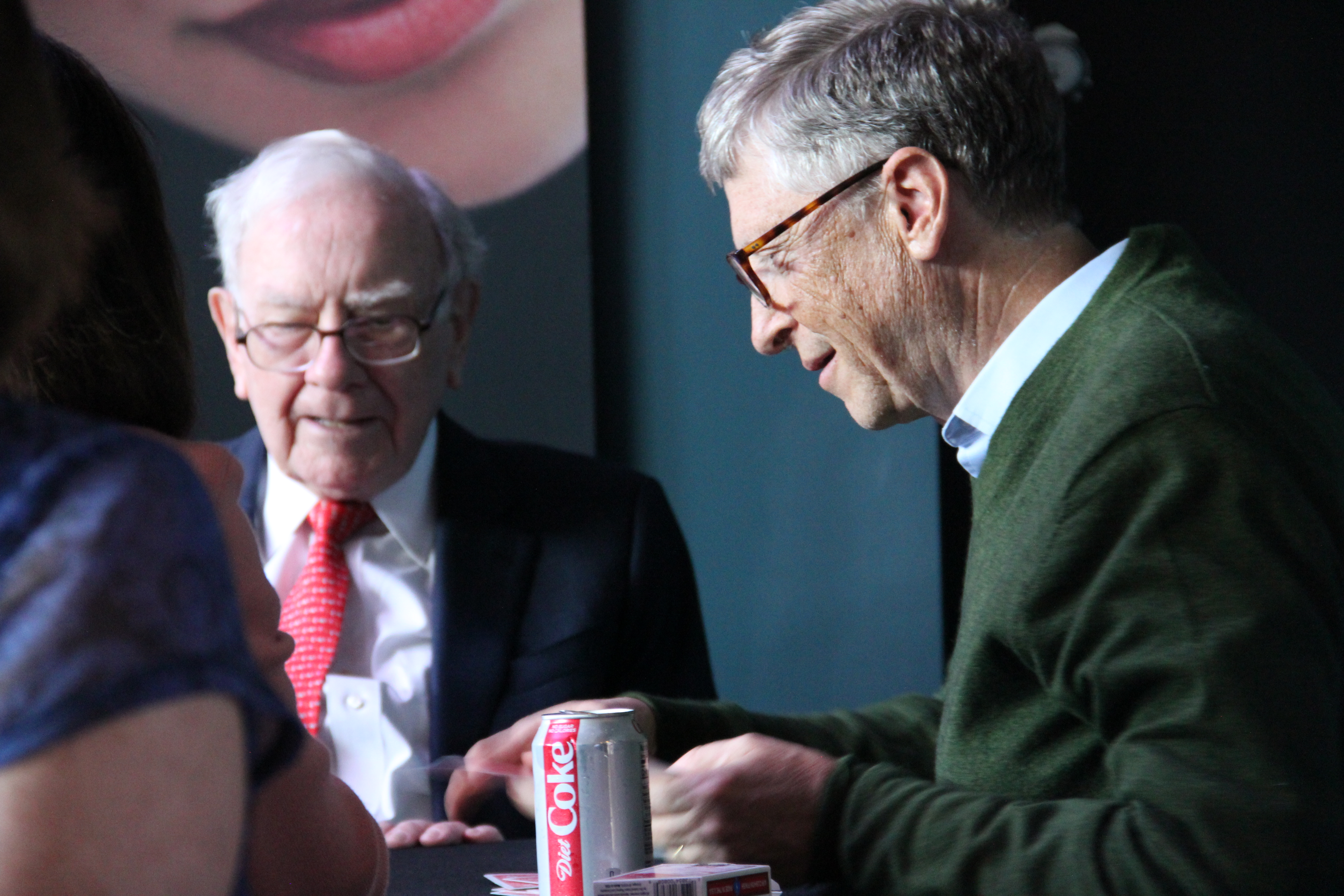
Buffett playing cards with Bill Gates at Borsheims during the 2018 shareholder's weekend

=== Books about Buffett ===
In October 2008, USA Today reported at least 47 books were in print with Buffett's name in the title. The article quoted the CEO of Borders Books, George Jones, as saying that the only other living persons named in as many book titles were U.S. presidents, world political figures and the Dalai Lama. Buffett said that his own personal favorite is a collection of his essays called The Essays of Warren Buffett, which he described as "a coherent rearrangement of ideas from my annual report letters".

Books or publications by Buffett:

- The Essays of Warren Buffett: Lessons for Corporate America, Warren Buffett and Lawrence A. Cunningham, The Cunningham Group; revised edition (April 11, 2001). ISBN 978-0-9664461-1-1.
- The Essays of Warren Buffett: Lessons for Corporate America, Second Edition, Warren E. Buffett and Lawrence A. Cunningham, The Cunningham Group; 2nd edition (April 14, 2008). ISBN 978-0-9664461-2-8.

Some best-selling, or otherwise notable, books about Buffett:

- Carol J. Loomis, Tap Dancing to Work: Warren Buffett on Practically Everything, 1966–2012: A Fortune Magazine Book.
- Preston Pysh, Warren Buffett's Three Favorite Books (an interactive book that references Buffett's Books for online videos).
- Roger Lowenstein, Buffett, Making of an American Capitalist.
- Robert Hagstrom, The Warren Buffett Way.
- Alice Schroeder, The Snowball: Warren Buffett and the Business of Life (written with Buffett's cooperation).
- Mary Buffett and David Clark, Buffettology and four subsequent books (combined sales of more than 1.5 million copies).
- Janet Lowe, Warren Buffett Speaks: Wit and Wisdom from the World's Greatest Investor.
- John Train, The Midas Touch: The Strategies That Have Made Warren Buffett 'America's Preeminent Investor'.
- Andrew Kilpatrick, Of Permanent Value: The Story of Warren Buffett (the longest of the books about Buffett, with 330 chapters, 1,874 pages and 1,400 photos, weighing 10.2 pounds).
- Robert P. Miles (2004). Warren Buffett Wealth: Principles and Practical Methods Used by the World's Greatest Investor. John Wiley and Sons. ISBN 978-0-471-46511-9.
- John P. Reese, "The Guru Investor: How to Beat the Market Using History's Best Investment Strategies" (includes step-by-step stock-picking method based on Buffett's approach).
- Tavakoli, Janet M. (January 6, 2009). Dear Mr. Buffett: What an Investor Learns 1,269 Miles from Wall Street. John Wiley & Sons. ISBN 978-0-470-44273-9.
- Janjigian, Vahan (May 1, 2008). Even Buffett Isn't Perfect: What You Can--and Can't--Learn from the World's Greatest Investor. Penguin. ISBN 9781440631474.

== See also ==
- Buffett indicator – Aggregate stock market valuation metric

Honorary titles
Preceded by Ingvar Kamprad	World's richest person ?–1995	Succeeded by Bill Gates
Preceded by Bill Gates	World's richest person 2008–2009	Succeeded by Bill Gates
