= One Thousand Ways to Make $1000 =

1936 book

- 2010 edition
- Author: Frances Minaker
- Genre: Personal finance
- Publisher: Dartnell
- Publication date: 1936
- OCLC: 541758

One Thousand Ways to Make $1000 is a 1936 non-fiction book of personal finance by Frances Minaker published by Dartnell. It gives specific examples of individuals who made enough money to start their own businesses by starting with as little as $5, and it encourages the reader to do the same.

The book inspired billionaire investor Warren Buffett to start earning money at the age of seven.
