= Elizabeth TenHouten =

American poet and musician

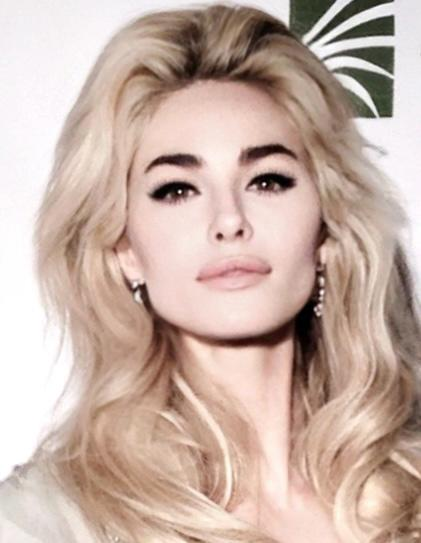
- TenHouten in 2024
- Born: Elizabeth TenHouten
- Education: Loyola Marymount University
- Occupations: Author; Singer-songwriter; Model; Poet; Businesswoman
- Spouse: Dennis Tito (m. 2016; div. 2019)
Musical career
- Genres: Alternative; Rock; Pop
- Instruments: Vocals; Guitar

Elizabeth TenHouten is an American poet, author, singer-songwriter, and model. She is the author of the poetry book The Stars Fell Into the Ocean and the recipe books Cooking Well: Beautiful Skin and Natural Beauty. As a musician, she has released the albums, Broken and Dream. She has also released the single "Broken Dreams".

== Early life and education ==
TenHouten was first scouted as a model when she was a teenager. She declined an offer to model in Asia in order to continue her education in the United States.

TenHouten received a bachelor’s degree in philosophy with honors from Loyola Marymount University.

== Career ==
TenHouten walked the runway for fashion designer Emily Factor's debut line in 2008, and was photographed by her brother, Davis Factor.

TenHouten published her first book, Cooking Well: Beautiful Skin, in 2009. The book's launch event was held at the Duncan Miller Art Gallery in Venice, California. Her second book, Natural Beauty: Homemade Recipes for Beautiful Skin and Hair, was released in 2013. She held a launch event for the book at the Eden Sassoon Salon in West Hollywood.

In 2014, TenHouten produced two fashion films for the jewelry line Lone Ones.

TenHouten owned the skincare brand BeautyRich Skincare. She founded the brand in 2016 after working with Benchmark to develop beauty products in 2015. The brand ended operations in 2018.

In 2016, TenHouten began writing music with British composer and frequent collaborator Andrew Raiher.

Town & Country and Bentley Motors hosted a dinner and celebration of design event at TenHouten's home in Pacific Palisades in 2017.

In 2020, she released her first album, Broken.

TenHouten published her poetry book, The Stars Fell Into the Ocean, in 2022. She held the book's launch event at the Wallis Annenberg Center for the Performing Arts in Beverly Hills. The book was a multimedia project that featured artistic photographs of TenHouten in addition to her poems.

She released the single "Broken Dreams" and its accompanying music video in 2023. She went on to release her second album, Dream, in 2024.

She has served as a columnist and/or contributor for publications such as Discover Beauty, ShareCare, and Beverly Hills Times Magazine, in which she wrote the monthly column "Natural Beauty". She has also written for Celeb Staff and Celeb Life, which she served as Editor-in-Chief for.

TenHouten has modeled for pictorials in magazines such as Pet Home Magazine, Style & Bliss Magazine, and Arsenic Magazine.

She has also modeled for photographers and visual artists such as Tyler Shields, Natalia Fedner, and Mallory Morrison, whose underwater photographs of her were displayed at Morrison’s gallery exhibits in Los Angeles and San Francisco. She was also photographed for visual artist Emma Ferreira’s project TROMI: The Reality of My Illusion. A photograph of TenHouten is on display at the Hotel Danieli in Venice, Italy.

== Bibliography ==
- TenHouten, E. (2009). Cooking Well: Beautiful Skin: Over 75 Antioxidant-Rich Recipes for Glowing Skin. United Kingdom: Hatherleigh Press. ISBN 978-1-57826-323-3
- TenHouten, E. (2013). Natural Beauty: Homemade Recipes for Radiant Skin & Hair. United Kingdom: Hatherleigh Company, Ltd. ISBN 978-1-57826-446-9
- TenHouten, E. (2022). The Stars Fell Into the Ocean. Self-published. ISBN 978-0-578-34414-0

== Discography ==
Albums

| Title | Label | Released |
|---|---|---|
| Broken | Independent | 2020 |
| Dream | Independent | 2024 |

=== Singles ===
| Title | Year | Album |
|---|---|---|
| "Set Me Free" (Remix) | 2020 | Broken |
| "Broken Dreams" | 2023 | Non-album single |
| "Blood from a Stone" | 2025 | Non-album single |
| "All of a Sudden" | 2026 | Non-album single |
