= Alice Schroeder =

American financial journalist and author

Alice D. Schroeder
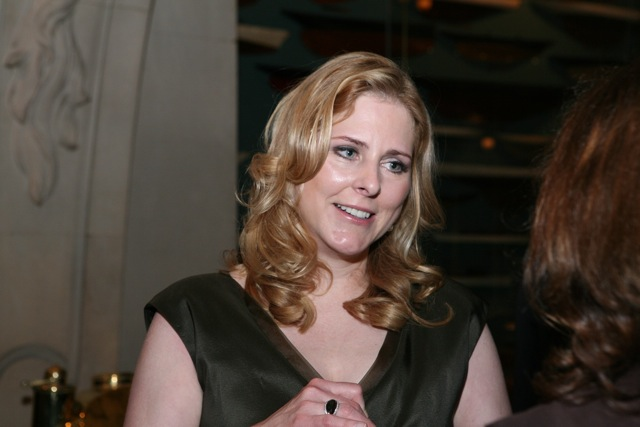
- Born: Alice Lynnette Davey; December 14, 1956 (age 69); Dallas, Texas, U.S.
- Education: McCombs School of Business (BBA, MBA)
- Occupations: Author; Finance journalist Insurance analyst Businesswoman
- Spouse: David Moyer
- Writing career
- Subjects: Finance, economics
- Notable work: The Snowball: Warren Buffett and the Business of Life

Alice Lynnette Davey Schroeder (born December 14, 1956) is an American executive, financial journalist, and author who was Berkshire Hathaway's leading sell-side insurance analyst at Morgan Stanley and later became Warren Buffett's appointed biographer. Schroeder remains a widely-regarded insurance expert, having most recently served as a Non-Executive Director on the Board of Prudential PLC. In the first week of October 2008, she published The Snowball: Warren Buffett and the Business of Life, a New York Times bestseller. As a project manager for the US Financial Accounting Standards Board, she oversaw the release of SFAS No. 113, a critical change in US reinsurance accounting regulations. Since 2008, Schroeder has worked as a columnist for Bloomberg News.

== Early life and education ==
Alice Lynnette Davey is a native of Dallas, Texas. She received a BBA in finance and an MBA from the McCombs School of Business at the University of Texas at Austin in 1978 and 1980.

== Career ==
=== Work for the Financial Accounting Foundation ===
From 1980 to 1991, Schroeder worked as a CPA at Ernst and Young, starting in Houston. In 1991 Schroeder became a project manager for the Financial Accounting Standards Board of the Financial Accounting Foundation in Norwalk, Connecticut. Her projects focused on ending abusive insurance industry accounting practices primarily due to the use of finite risk transfer contracts, an issue which later became central to the criminal allegation faced by employees of AIG and Berkshire Hathaway-owned General Re. Schroeder's work included overseeing the release of:

- SFAS No. 113: Accounting and Reporting for Reinsurance of Short-Duration and Long-Duration Contracts,
- EITF Issue 93-6: Accounting for Multiple-Year Retrospectively Rated Contracts (RRC's), and
- EITF Issue 93-14: Accounting for Multiple-Year Retrospectively Rated Insurance Contracts by Insurance Enterprises and Other Enterprises.

When Maurice R. Greenberg was terminated from AIG at the insistence of New York State Attorney General Eliot Spitzer, five employees of General Re and AIG were also indicted in connection with an accounting fraud at AIG that overstated reserves in this and subsequent quarters, the accounting rules violated were those Schroeder oversaw as an FASB project manager. She testified as an expert witness about accounting for finite risk reinsurance at this federal criminal conspiracy trial in Hartford, Connecticut. Warren Buffett was never named in the case. Former AIG CEO Greenberg and CFO Howie Smith disputed in court whether the New York AG had the power to pursue a civil fraud case against them. The U.S. Second Circuit Court of Appeals has overturned the convictions of all five Gen Re and AIG employees. In mid-2012 they signed deferred prosecution agreements with the Department of Justice that acknowledged mistakes and misjudgments but not criminal wrongdoing.

=== Insurance analyst ===
In 1993, Schroeder left the FASB to work as a sell-side insurance investment analyst for Dowling Partners in Hartford, a boutique firm run by V.J. Dowling. In 1994, Schroeder moved to CIBC Oppenheimer. In 1998, she joined PaineWebber. In 1998 Schroeder wrote Warren Buffett a letter requesting a meeting for her clients about Berkshire's recent acquisition of the reinsurer General Re, which she covered. Afterward, Buffett approached her to become the first and only Wall Street sell-side analyst to whom he would speak. Schroeder then initiated coverage of the hard-to-analyze Berkshire Hathaway in a widely-admired report. This was the first significant Wall Street coverage the company received. In 2000, Schroeder was hired by Morgan Stanley, where she was voted the #1 property-casualty insurance analyst two years in a row after having been ranked a member of the Institutional Investor All-America Research Team for seven years. In 2002, Schroeder was voted one of Business Insurance magazine's "Rising Stars". That year, she was also named analyst/researcher of the year by The Review, a reinsurance industry publication.

== Books and reporting ==
=== The Snowball ===
In 2003, Schroeder has reported that an investment writer approached her to jointly write a book about Warren Buffett and corporate governance. Schroeder felt this was not the right book and discussed another idea with Buffett, who offered to cooperate with her if she wrote a more comprehensive book. In June 2003, Schroeder, then a managing director at Morgan Stanley, began traveling to Omaha to research and write Buffett's official biography, The Snowball. Schroeder spent approximately 2,000 hours with Buffett and interviewed 250 other people. Schroeder reportedly received a $7 million book contract for publishing The Snowball.

The Snowball was published September 29, 2008, and debuted at #1 on The New York Times, The Wall Street Journal and Publishers Weekly lists of hardcover nonfiction best-sellers and remained on the bestseller list for more than three months. After the book's publication, Buffett reportedly stopped speaking to Schroeder. He canceled the yearly dinner Schroeder hosted in Omaha at which she interviewed him before nearly two hundred people. The New York Times reviewer Janet Maslin called it one of her ten favorite books of 2008. Time and People also named The Snowball one of the ten best books of the year.

=== MBIA and Bill Ackman report ===
In 2002, activist hedge fund manager Bill Ackman challenged bond insurer MBIA's AAA rating calling for a division between MBIA's bond insurers' structured finance business and its municipal bond insurance side. Ackman published a report raising extensive concerns about MBIA's continued solvency. He gave Schroeder's team an early draft and suggested they downgrade MBIA, but they initially resisted. Schroeder and her colleague Vinay Saqi eventually responded to Ackman's report, partially acknowledging Ackman's thesis.

=== Goldman Sachs pistol retraction ===
On November 30, 2009, Schroeder published an opinion piece on Bloomberg News stating that several Goldman Sachs bankers, in a show of prescience about potential social unrest, had obtained pistol permits. In a December 9, 2009, The Wall Street Journal blog post, journalist Susanne Craig reported that New York City Police Department spokesman Paul J. Browne retracted certain earlier information it had earlier given Alice Schroeder on the number of banker permit applications, which was part of the basis for the column. Bloomberg has since re-published the column on its website in corrected form.

=== First Call estimate ===
In 2002, The Wall Street Journal broke the news that Thomson Reuters' First Call, a research database which compiles the earnings estimates of Wall Street analysts to publish consensus earnings estimates for public companies, removed Schroeder's estimate on Chubb Insurance from the database after Schroeder refused to raise her estimate on Chubb to match that of other analysts, whom she disagreed with. Once other investment banks complained about similar experiences, First Call agreed to include a broader range of analyst forecasts in its estimates and better disclose the factors that account for their differences in judgment.

== Personal life ==
Schroeder is married to David Moyer. She is a member of the Southern Dames of America and the Daughters of the American Revolution, serving as an officer in the latter organization's Connecticut State Society Cameo Club and Ellswoth Memorial Association.
