= Wilshire Advisors =

American independent investment management firm

Wilshire Advisors, LLC
- Trade name: Wilshire
- Formerly: Wilshire Associates, Inc.
- Type: Private
- Industry: Investment management
- Founded: 1972; 54 years ago
- Founder: Dennis Tito
- Headquarters: Santa Monica, California, United States
- Key people: Jason Schwarz (CEO)
- Products: Stock indexes, Analytical software, Consulting services, Fund of funds
- AUM: US$123 Billion (December 2024)
- Number of employees: 350+
- Website: wilshire.com

Wilshire Advisors (previously Wilshire Associates) is an American independent investment management firm that offers consulting services and analytical products and manages fund of funds investment vehicles for a global client base. Wilshire manages capital for more than 600 institutional investors globally representing more than $8 trillion of capital. Wilshire is also known for the creation of the Wilshire 5000 stock index in 1974 and more recently the Wilshire 4500 stock index.

Wilshire operates from four business units:

- Wilshire Analytics
- Wilshire Consulting
- Wilshire Funds Management
- Wilshire Private Markets

Wilshire is headquartered in Santa Monica, California, with offices in the U.S. in New York, New Jersey, Pittsburgh, Chicago and Denver as well as internationally in London, Singapore, Amsterdam, Melbourne, Suzhou and Hong Kong.

== History ==
Prior logo of Wilshire Associates

Wilshire was founded in 1972 by Dennis Tito, who was an early pioneer of applying computer-based technologies to investment applications. Since the early 1970s, the firm developed from a technology firm into an investment management operation. In 1974, the firm created its signature Wilshire 5000 Stock index, which is a widely used index of all stocks actively traded in the United States.

Wilshire established an early reputation by creating the first asset/liability model for pension funds in the 1970s, ten years before actuarial and accounting firms began to adopt this technology. Wilshire was also among the first to produce investment management tools to create index funds, optimize portfolios, construct bond portfolios and measure performance.

In 1981, Wilshire launched its investment consulting business to address the needs of the plan sponsor community providing support for the pensions' investment professionals. Also in the early 1980s, Wilshire began to develop its own investment products. In the late 1980s and early 90s, Wilshire began to expand its investment activities into private market investments creating a series of private equity and venture capital product offerings.

In 2003, Wilshire was targeted by New York State Attorney General Eliot Spitzer in connection to its trading practices as part of a wide ranging 2003 investigation of mutual funds.

In January 2021, Wilshire Associates was bought by CC Capital and Motive Partners, and became Wilshire Advisors, LLC.

In 2021, the Financial Times (FT) started publishing 10 Wilshire indexes for individual digital assets (cryptocurrencies) and three multi-digital-asset indexes.

On March 27, 2023, Wilshire Advisors spun out its indices business (including the Wilshire 5000) into a separate corporation, Wilshire OpCo UK Limited d/b/a Wilshire Indexes, owned by Wilshire Advisors, the Financial Times, and Singapore Exchange. In January 2024, Nikkei, Inc. joined as a strategic investor in Wilshire Indexes.

In April 2025, Jason Schwarz was named CEO while former CEO Andy Stewart was named Executive Chairman.

In early March 2026, Wilshire Indexes went into administration, and Wilshire Advisors reacquired the FT Wilshire 5000 Index series. The FT cobranding of the Wilshire 5000 was subsequently dropped.

== Business lines ==
Wilshire operates from four main business units.

=== Wilshire Analytics ===
Wilshire's Analytics Division provides the firm's investment technology products including desktop applications for investment managers. The Wilshire Quantum Series is Wilshire Analytics' family of software for investment accounting, performance measurement, performance attribution, risk management, portfolio optimization, trade order management, and other marketing and client servicing support for multi-currency portfolios.

=== Wilshire Consulting ===
Wilshire's Consulting division provides investment consulting services including asset allocation, investment structure, manager search and performance measurement to public and corporate pension funds, endowments, foundations, and insurance companies. Wilshire provides consulting services to more than 125 clients with total assets in excess of $1 trillion.

=== Wilshire Funds Management ===
Among the white label investment products that Wilshire offers are:

- risk-based portfolios;
- target-maturity portfolios;
- multi-manager portfolios;
- global equity and fixed income portfolios; and
- global tactical asset allocation overlay portfolios.

=== Wilshire Private Markets ===
Wilshire's Private Markets division manages in excess of $6.5 billion across a range of fund of funds vehicles dedicated to private equity and venture capital funds. Wilshire often structures its investment mandates to meet specific objectives.

== See also ==
- Buffett indicator
