= The Snowball: Warren Buffett and the Business of Life =

Biography of Warren Buffett by Alice Schroeder

- First edition cover
- Author: Alice Schroeder
- Language: English
- Subject: Biography
- Genre: Biography, business, investing
- Publisher: Bantam Books
- Publication date: September 29, 2008
- Publication place: United States
- Media type: Print, e-book
- Pages: 976 pp. (hardcover)
- ISBN: 978-0553805093

The Snowball: Warren Buffett and the Business of Life (ISBN 0553805096) is a biography of Warren Buffett by Alice Schroeder.

== History ==
Before this book was written, Warren Buffett rejected numerous approaches by biographers, journalists, and publishers to cooperate on an account of his life. After spending six years as the only Wall Street analyst Buffett would speak to, Alice Schroeder was approached by Buffett to write his biography. In 2003, she left her job at Morgan Stanley and traveled to Omaha to work on the book full-time. Schroeder spent over 2,000 hours reading Buffett's personal files while interviewing Buffett, his wife, children, sisters, friends, and business associates. Before Schroeder began writing, Buffett told her he would not ask for any revisions once the book was finished and, where accounts of his life differed, to always use the "less flattering version".

== Reception ==
The Snowball was Amazon.com's best business and investing book of the year 2008. Time Magazine, People Magazine, and critic Janet Maslin of The New York Times named it one of ten best books of the year. The Washington Post, the Financial Times, BusinessWeek, and Publishers Weekly also each named The Snowball the best book of 2008. The book was shortlisted for the 2008 Financial Times and Goldman Sachs Business Book of the Year Award, as well as the 2009 Gerald Loeb Award for distinguished business journalism. A reviewer in The Economist noted that for those "hoping for detailed analyses of his investment record" the place to start is "Mr. Buffett’s collected essays and annual reports". As a look at Buffett, the Washington Post stated The Snowball was "the most detailed glimpse inside Warren Buffett and his world that we likely will ever get...a bible for capitalists” and the Los Angeles Times wrote it was "the most authoritative portrait of one of the most important American investors of our time".

== Editions ==
- 1st Edition, 2008, Bantam Books, ISBN 978-0-553-80509-3
- Unabridged Audio Edition, 2008, Random Audio, ISBN 978-1-4159-4800-2
- Abridged Audio Edition, 2008, Random Audio, ISBN 978-0-7393-3406-5
- Paperback, 2009, Bantam Books, ISBN 978-0-553-38461-1

Preceded by Hot, Flat, and Crowded by Thomas L. Friedman	#1 The New York Times Best Seller Non-Fiction; October 19, 2008 - November 9, 2008	Succeeded by Against Medical Advice: A True Story by James Patterson.
