= Wilshire 4500 =

The Wilshire 4500 Completion Index, more commonly the Wilshire 4500, is a capitalization-weighted index of all stocks actively traded in the United States with the exception of the stocks included in the S&P 500 index. The index is created by removing the stocks in the S&P 500 Index from the Wilshire 5000.

Many managers of small-cap and mid-cap funds use the Wilshire 4500 as a performance benchmark. The Thrift Savings Plan's small-cap fund used this index, although it now tracks the Dow Jones U.S. Completion Total Stock Market Index.

== See also ==
- Wilshire 5000
- Wilshire Associates
- Russell Small Cap Completeness Index
