= Dennis Tito =

American engineer and entrepreneur, also the first space tourist (born 1940)

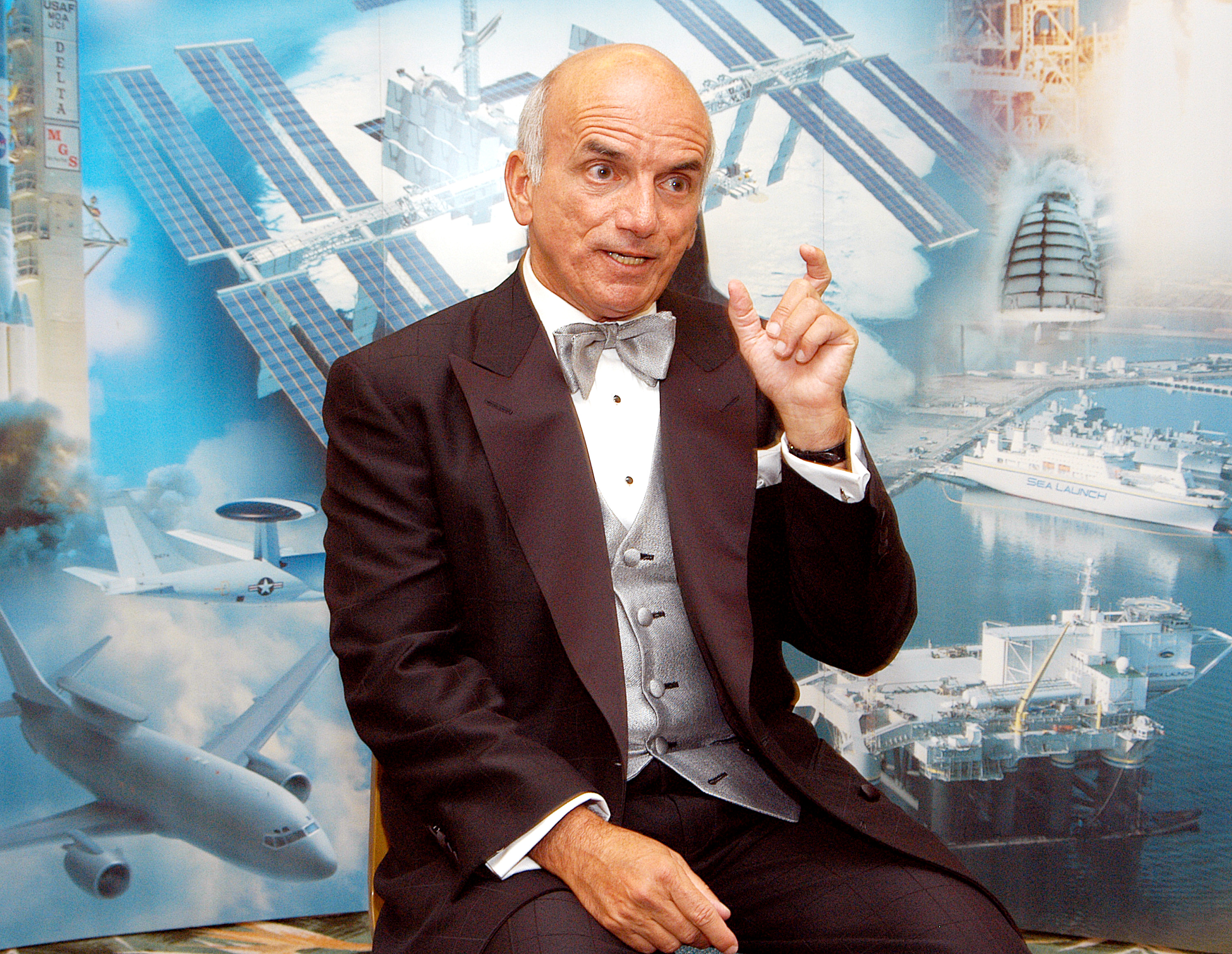
- Born: August 8, 1940 (age 86); Queens, New York City, U.S.
- Education: New York University (B.S.); Rensselaer Polytechnic Institute (M.S.)
- Occupation: Entrepreneur
- Children: 2
- Space career

Space tourist
- Time in space: 7d 22h 04m
- Selection: 2000
- Missions: ISS EP-1 (Soyuz TM-32 / Soyuz TM-31)

Dennis Anthony Tito (born August 8, 1940) is an American engineer and entrepreneur. During mid-2001, he became the first space tourist to fund his own visit to space, when he spent nearly eight days in orbit as a crew member of ISS EP-1, a visiting mission to the International Space Station. This mission was launched by the spacecraft Soyuz TM-32, and was landed by Soyuz TM-31.

== Life and career ==
Tito was born in Queens, New York. He graduated from Forest Hills High School in New York City. He holds a Bachelor of Science degree in astronautics and aeronautics from New York University, 1962 and a Master of Science degree in engineering science from Rensselaer Polytechnic Institute satellite campus in Hartford, Connecticut. He is a member of Psi Upsilon and received an honorary doctorate of engineering from Rensselaer Polytechnic Institute on May 18, 2002 and is a former scientist of the NASA Jet Propulsion Laboratory.

Tito was appointed to the Los Angeles Department of Water and Power Board of Commissioners during the 1990s and as such he facilitated the 1994 state ruling protecting Mono Lake from excessive water diversions by the city.

=== Investment career ===
In 1972, he founded Wilshire Associates, a major provider of investment management, consulting and technology services in Santa Monica, California. Tito serves an international clientele representing assets of $71 billion. Wilshire uses quantitative analytics to analyze market risks – a method Tito is credited with helping to develop by applying the same techniques he used to determine a spacecraft's path at JPL. Despite a career change from aerospace engineering to investment management, Tito remained interested in space.

In 2020, Tito sold his interest in Wilshire Associates.

=== Personal life ===
Dennis divorced from his wife Suzanne Tito during the early 1990s, to whom he had been married since the 1970s. They had 2 children together. She had been CFO of Wilshire Associates at the time they relocated into their mansion in Pacific Palisades in 1990 with their children, that they had been building since 1987.

In 2011 Dennis married Elizabeth Pavlova, a Russian investor and Stanford alumna. They lived at Pacific Palisades in Los Angeles.

From 2016 to 2019, Dennis was married to Elizabeth TenHouten, a businesswoman, poet, author and model.

Since 2020, Dennis has been married to Akiko Tito, an engineer, pilot, and investor, who has been interested in spaceflight since childhood. She was born in Tokyo, has an economics degree and relocated to New York in 1995, raising a child prior to her marriage to Dennis.

=== 21st century space interests ===
==== Spaceflight ====
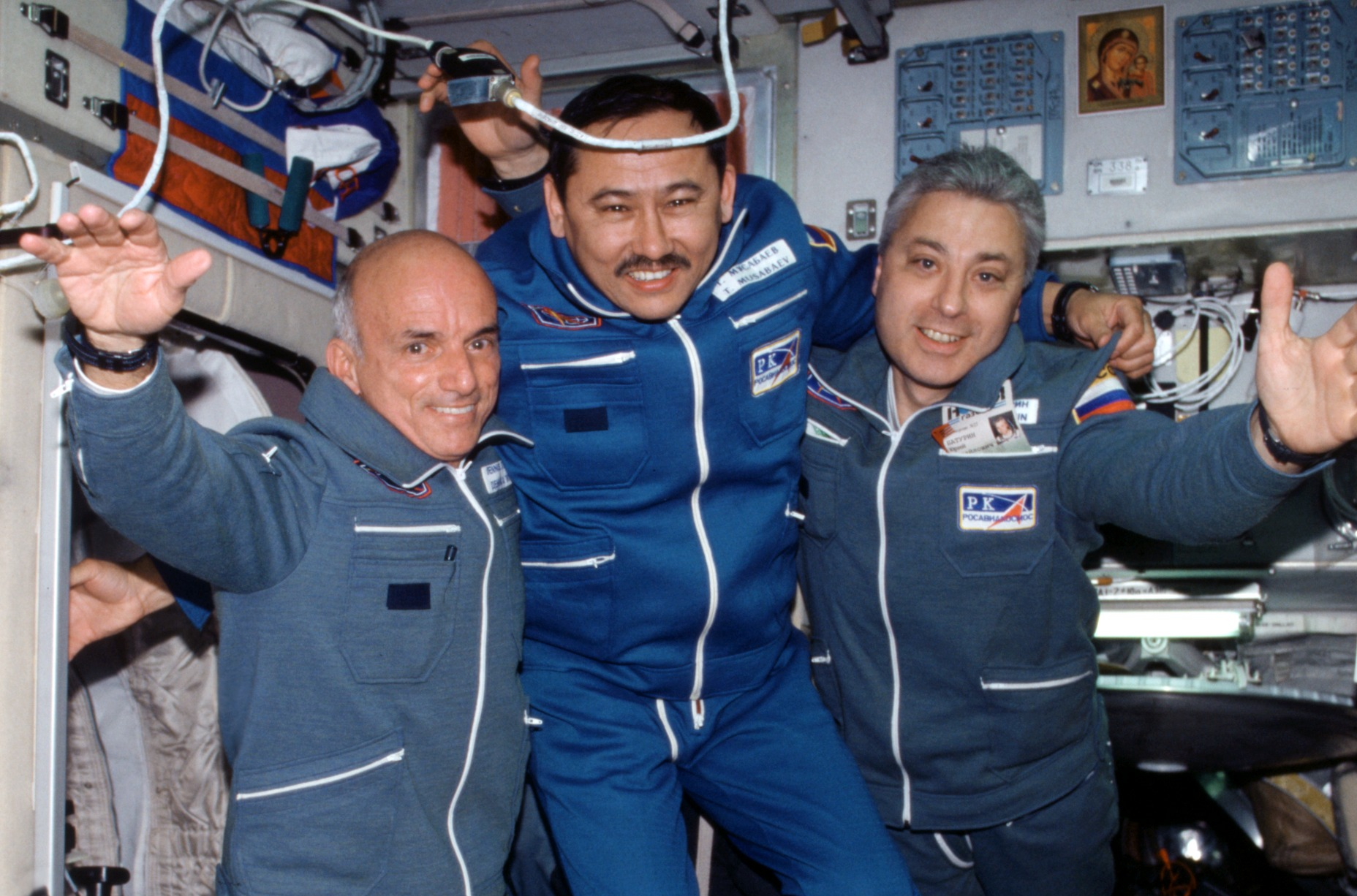
Crew of Soyuz TM-32. (L-R: Tito, Talgat Musabayev, and Yuri Baturin).

After paying a reported $20 million, Tito was accepted by the Russian Federal Space Agency as a candidate for a commercial spaceflight. Tito was criticised by NASA before the launch, primarily by Daniel Goldin, at that time the Administrator of NASA, who considered it inappropriate for a tourist to ride into space. MirCorp, Goldin and Tito are profiled in the documentary movie Orphans of Apollo. When Tito arrived at the Johnson Space Center for additional training for the American portion of the ISS, Robert D. Cabana, NASA manager, sent Tito and his two fellow cosmonauts home, stating, "...We will not be able to begin training, because we are not willing to train with Dennis Tito".

Later, by an arrangement with space tourism company Space Adventures, Ltd., Tito joined the Soyuz TM-32 mission which launched on April 28, 2001. The spacecraft docked with the International Space Station. Tito and his fellow cosmonauts spent 7 days, 22 hours, 4 minutes in space and orbited the Earth 128 times. Tito performed several scientific experiments in orbit that he said would be useful for his company and business.

Since returning from space, he has testified at the Senate Committee on Commerce, Science & Transportation, Subcommittee on Science, Technology, and Space and the House Committee on Science, Subcommittee on Space & Aeronautics Joint Hearing on "Commercial Human Spaceflight" on July 24, 2003. Ten years after his flight, he gave an interview to BBC News about it.

==== Inspiration Mars Foundation ====
In February 2013, Tito announced his intention to send a privately financed spaceflight to Mars by 2018, stating that the technology exists already and that the problems that need to be solved are only the rigor of a 501-day voyage psychologically and physically for the human crew. However, in November 2013, Tito and other Mars Inspiration team members admitted that their plan was impossible without significant assistance and funding from NASA.

==== SpaceX Starship’s first commercial spaceflight around the Moon ====
On 12 October 2022, SpaceX announced that Dennis and Akiko Tito will be on the crew of the second commercial spaceflight of Starship around the Moon. This is now the first planned commercial spaceflight of Starship around the Moon following the cancellation of the dearMoon project.

== See also ==
- List of space travelers by name
- Toyohiro Akiyama - The first civilian to fly aboard a commercial space flight
