= Wilshire 5000 =

US total stock market index

Wilshire 5000 Index
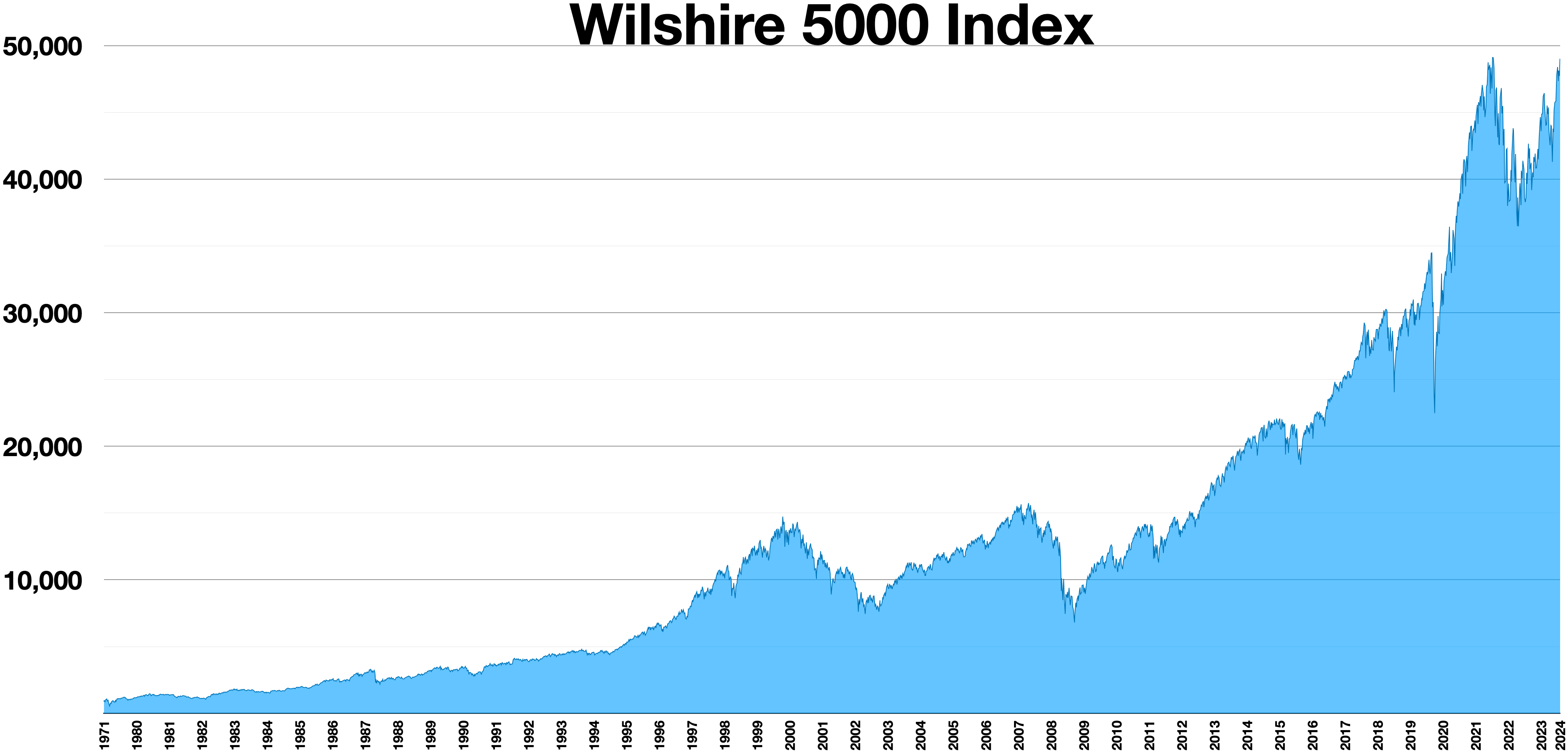
- Index from 1971-2024
- Foundation: 1974; 52 years ago
- Operator: Wilshire Advisors
- Exchanges: NASDAQ; NYSE; NYSE Arca; NYSE American; Cboe BZX
- Trading symbol: ^FTW5000; ^W5000; W5000
- Constituents: 3,414 (December 31, 2025)
- Type: Total market
- Market cap: US$70.3 trillion (December 31, 2025)
- Weighting method: Free-float capitalization-weighted
- Related indices: Wilshire 4500, FT Wilshire 2500
- Website: www.wilshireindexes.com/products/ft-wilshire-5000-index-series

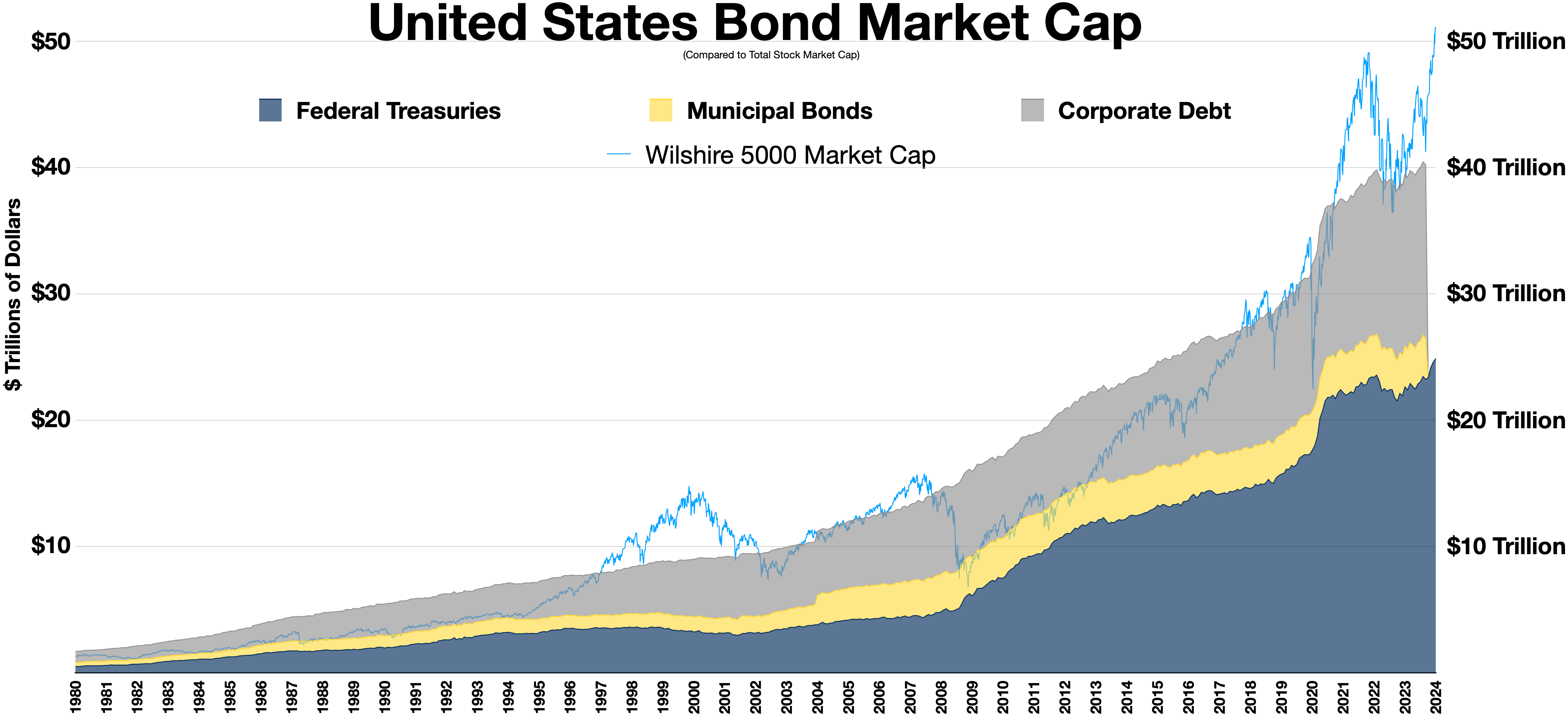
US bond market compared to total stock market cap (Wilshire 5000). Mortgage-backed securities not shown. Wilshire 5000 Corporate bonds Municipal bonds US Treasuries

The Wilshire 5000 Index (previously the FT Wilshire 5000 Index or Wilshire 5000 Total Market Index), or simply the Wilshire 5000, is a free-float capitalization-weighted stock market index that includes the market value of all American stocks actively traded in the United States. As of December 31, 2025, the index contained 3,414 components. The index is maintained by Wilshire Advisors LLC, which is owned by CC Capital and Motive Partners. It is intended to measure the performance of most publicly traded companies headquartered in the United States, with readily available price data. The index includes a majority of the common stocks and real estate investment trusts traded primarily through New York Stock Exchange, Nasdaq, or the NYSE American. Bulletin Board, penny stocks, stocks of extremely small companies, limited partnerships and ADRs are not included. The index is associated with several ticker symbols, depending on the market or website, including ^FTW5000, ^W5000, and W5000.

Of the popular indexes, the Wilshire 5000 has been found to be the best to use as a benchmark for US stock valuations.

== Investing in the index and similar indices ==
Wilshire Mutual Funds offers a mutual fund that tracks the Wilshire 5000, under the ticker symbols WFIVX and WINDX. There is no exchange-traded fund that tracks the Wilshire 5000; however, there are ETFs that track similar indices:

- The Morningstar US Total Market Index is a very similar comprehensive index of US stocks.
- After Dow Jones and Wilshire split up, Dow Jones created the Dow Jones U.S. Total Stock Market Index, similar to the Wilshire 5000.
- S&P Dow Jones Indices also offers the very similar S&P Total Market Index.
- The Russell 3000 Index is another broad market index comparable to the Wilshire 5000, though it includes fewer micro-caps.
- The Russell 3000E Index is a very similar comprehensive index of US stocks.

== History ==
The Wilshire 5000 Total Market Index was established by Dennis Tito, founder of Wilshire Associates in 1974. At its inception in 2000, Vanguard's US total stock market index fund tracked the Wilshire 5000.

It was renamed the Dow Jones Wilshire 5000 in April 2004, after Dow Jones & Company assumed responsibility for its calculation and maintenance. In 2005, Vanguard's fund switched to tracking a competing total market index from MSCI.

On March 31, 2009, the partnership with Dow Jones was terminated and the index returned to Wilshire Associates.

On June 30, 2021, the index was renamed to the FT Wilshire 5000 Index, in partnership with the Financial Times (FT).

Since 2023, calculation of the index was performed by Wilshire OpCo UK Limited d/b/a Wilshire Indexes, a spin-off owned by Wilshire Advisors, the Financial Times, Nikkei, Inc., and Singapore Exchange.

In March 2026, Wilshire Indexes went into administration and the Wilshire 5000 index series was reacquired by Wilshire Advisors. The FT cobranding was subsequently dropped.

== Closing milestones ==
- The base value for the index was 1404.60 points on base date December 31, 1980, when it had a total market capitalization of US$1,404.596 billion.
- The index increased tenfold in less than twenty years from its base date, peaking at a 20th-century closing record high of 14,751.64 points on March 24, 2000, a level that was not surpassed until February 20, 2007. A hypothetical investment in the Wilshire 5000, made at the 2000 peak and with subsequent dividends reinvested, did not become profitable on a closing basis until October 3, 2006.
- On April 20, 2007, the index closed above 15,000 for the first time. On that day, the S&P 500 was still several percentage points below its March 2000 high, because small cap stocks outperformed large cap stocks.
- The index reached an all-time high on October 9, 2007, at 15,806.69.
- In late 2007, the subprime mortgage crisis and the following 2008 financial crisis plunged the United States into a renewed bear market.
- On October 8, 2008, the Wilshire 5000 closed below 10,000 for the first time since 2003. The index continued trading downward towards a 13-year low, reaching a bottom of 6,858.43 points, on March 9, 2009, representing a loss of about $10.9 trillion in market capitalization from its highs in 2007.
- The Wilshire 5000 gained approximately $2.5 trillion in market value during the first 11 months of 2009 while the index rose 2,105 points.
- The index achieved a new highest yearly close on December 31, 2012, a few percent above those of 1999 and 2007, closing with 14,995.11 points. However, it continued to rise in the short term such that, on February 8, 2013, the index surpassed the 16,000 level for the first time. It was the first of four 1000-point milestones that the index reached in 2013, as the index closed above 17,000 for the first time on May 3, 18,000 for the first time on August 1, and 19,000 for the first time on November 14. The Wilshire 5000 closed out 2013 on a record high, finishing the December 31, 2013 trading session at 19,706.03.
- On February 28, 2014, the Wilshire 5000 had its first intraday high over 20,000. On March 4, the index closed above this milestone for the first time. On July 1, 2014, the index closed above 21,000 for the first time. It closed above 25,000 for the first time in mid-2017.
- On August 24, 2018, the Wilshire 5000 had its first intraday high and its first closing over 30,000.
- In March 2020, the index closed below 25,000 for the first time since 2016.
- On January 7, 2021, the Wilshire 5000 had its first intraday high and its first closing over 40,000.
- On February 2, 2024, the Wilshire 5000 had its first intraday high closing over 50,000.
- On November 7, 2024, the Wilshire 5000 had its first closing above 60,000.

== Record high values ==
Type	Date set	Value
Highest closing	Tuesday, January 6, 2026	69,423.01
Highest intraday	Tuesday, January 6, 2026	69,452.55

== Versions ==
There are five versions of the index:

- Full capitalization total return
- Full capitalization price
- Float-adjusted total return
- Float-adjusted price
- Equal weight

The difference between the total return and price versions of the index is that the total return versions accounts for reinvestment of dividends. The difference between the full capitalization, float-adjusted, and equal weight versions is in how the index components are weighted. The full cap index uses the total shares outstanding for each company. The float-adjusted index uses shares adjusted for free float. The equal-weighted index assigns each security in the index the same weight.

== Calculation ==
Let:

- M = Number of issues included in the index;
- P_{i} = Price of one share of issue i included in the index;
- N_{i} = Number of shares of issue i for the full capitalization version, or the float of issue i for the float-adjusted version;
- $\alpha$ = a fixed scaling factor.

The value of the index is then:

$$\alpha \sum_{i=1}^{M} N_i P_i$$

At present, one index point corresponds to a little more than US$1 billion of market capitalization.

The list of issues included in the index is updated monthly to add new listings resulting from corporate spin-offs and initial public offerings, and to remove issues which move to the pink sheets or that have ceased trading for at least 10 consecutive days.

== See also ==
- Buffett indicator, a statistic for assessing the general valuation level of an entire stock market. In the US, the Wilshire 5000 is often used as one of the inputs.
- Wilshire 4500
- S&P 1500
- Bond market
