= Tax Attractiveness Index =

Measure of a country's taxation policies

The Tax Attractiveness Index (T.A.X.) measures the appeal of a country's tax environment and the possibilities of tax planning for companies. Maintained for 100 countries globally with data starting from 2005, the index tracks 20 equally weighted components of real-world tax systems that influence corporate location decisions.

The index scores range between zero and one. As a country's index value approaches one, its tax environment becomes more attractive from a corporate perspective. The 100 countries include 41 European countries, 19 American countries, 6 Caribbean countries, 18 countries across Africa and the Middle East, and 16 within the Asia-Pacific region.

== History ==
The T.A.X. was developed by two German economists, Sara Keller and Deborah Schanz. Originally, the T.A.X. covered 16 different components of real-world tax systems and the period from 2005 to 2009. The index was further developed by Andreas Dinkel, who added four more components. The index is updated for upcoming years. Previous research showed that the T.A.X. has explanatory power for corporate location decisions, such as those regarding subsidiaries and patents.

== Measurement ==
The T.A.X. represents a new approach to measuring the attractiveness of a country's tax environment. To construct the index, values are added for all 20 tax factors per country, which have been identified as determining a country's tax environment, and this sum is divided by 20. Hence, the index represents an equally weighted sum of 20 tax factors. The index has the purpose of indicating the attractiveness of a country's tax environment and the opportunities for tax planning. Because the components of the T.A.X. are measured on an annual basis, the index is as well.

To calculate the index, the variables need to be constrained to values ranging between zero and one. In cases where quantification schemes had to be developed, the measurement of the respective tax factors has already been adjusted to this scale. A country's tax environment is considered more attractive the more the value of the index approaches one. The T.A.X. is an alternative measurement to the statutory tax rate and can be considered to be a more accurate proxy for a country's tax environment. Many high-tax countries, especially in Europe, offer extremely favorable tax conditions. Thus, the T.A.X. reflects the tax attractiveness of a country better than single determinants do.

== Variables ==
=== Anti-avoidance rules ===
The tax law of many countries includes provisions aimed at preventing abuse. Tax authorities try to challenge fictitious or artificial transactions and combat tax evasion. Transactions which are only carried out to receive a tax benefit should be prevented. Furthermore, transactions whose primary intention is tax avoidance should be prohibited. If a transaction is considered harmful tax avoidance under anti-avoidance legislation, the tax burden is calculated as if the abuse had not occurred. As tax planning schemes might not work under certain anti-avoidance rules, it is favorable for companies if such legislation does not exist.

=== CFC rules ===
Generally, the country of residence of subsidiaries is allowed to tax the subsidiaries' profits. The country of the parent company only taxes profits that are distributed in the form of dividends. This system leaves room for abuse by multinational companies, as it can be considered an incentive to transfer income to low-tax countries. Therefore, high-tax countries implement controlled foreign corporation (CFC) rules to prevent the erosion of their tax base. If a country has CFC rules, the companies have less scope in their tax planning activities.

=== Corporate income tax rate ===
In association with the tax base, the corporate income tax rate is the main component of the corporate tax burden. Consequently, countries offering a lower statutory tax rate are more popular among companies than countries with high statutory tax rates.

=== Depreciation ===
An important element of the tax base is tax depreciation rules. The faster companies can depreciate assets, the higher the present value of the tax savings is, as the tax base is lowered earlier.

=== EU member state ===
In the European Union (EU), withholding taxes are reduced by the Parent-Subsidiary Directive as well as the Interest and Royalties Directive for transactions within the EU. As a consequence, royalties, interest, and dividends can potentially be transferred between two EU member countries without withholding taxes being charged on the level of the source state.

=== Group taxation regime ===
Countries that offer group taxation allow the losses of group members to be offset against the profits of other members of the group. In this way, the tax burden of a corporate group can be reduced. As a result, a group taxation regime is an advantage to companies.

=== Holding tax climate ===
Holding companies are a central tool in many tax planning strategies of companies. The location decision for holdings depends on multiple general tax factors (such as participation exemption for dividends and capital gains, a wide treaty network, low withholding taxes, a group taxation regime) as well as on specific holding regimes. Certain countries thus try to enhance their tax attractiveness by offering special regimes for holding companies. Special rules for holdings include the exemption from local corporate income tax (e.g., in Switzerland), exemption from current taxation (e.g., in Luxembourg until 2010), the exemption from tax on all disposals of shares in subsidiaries (e.g., in Singapore), or a refund of taxes paid to non-resident shareholders if profits are distributed (e.g., in Malta).

=== Loss carryback ===
Loss carryback lowers the tax burden of companies. Current losses can be offset against the profits of past periods. Loss carryback provisions are an attractive factor for multinational enterprises.

=== Loss carryforward ===
Loss carryforward lowers the future tax burden of companies. Current losses can be offset against the profits of future periods. Loss carryforward provisions are an attractive factor for multinational enterprises.

=== Patent box regime ===
Companies that own substantial intellectual property (e.g., patents or trademarks) often provide third parties with licenses and receive royalty payments in return. In some countries, ordinary business income is taxed at a higher rate than royalty income. Therefore, countries that tax royalties at low effective tax rates (i.e., where a patent box regime applies) are attractive for companies.

=== Personal income tax rate ===
The tax burden of employees is represented by the personal income tax rate. It increases labor costs for corporations. The lower the income tax rate, the more attractive the country thus is for a corporation.

=== R&D incentives ===
R&D investments represent a large expenditure and affect future product offerings. Thus, R&D incentives are crucial for many enterprises. Some countries offer tax incentives for resident companies conducting R&D, which helps companies to reduce their after-tax R&D costs.

=== Taxation of capital gains ===
Double taxation is caused by the taxation of capital gains, as capital gains contain past company profits and expected future company profits on an after-tax basis. It is therefore advantageous for companies if a country grants a (partial) tax exemption concerning capital gains.

=== Taxation of dividends received ===
Within a multinational group, it is possible to transfer profits generated in one subsidiary to other subsidiaries or the parent company via dividends. For multinational enterprises, it is very attractive if profits can be transferred easily without causing further taxation. An exemption of taxation guarantees the highest degree of flexibility. De facto, the distributed profits have already been taxed on the level of the distributing subsidiary. A lot of countries consider this when taxing dividends received: in many jurisdictions, dividends received from domestic and/or foreign subsidiaries are disregarded for the taxable income of the receiving company.

=== Thin capitalization rules ===
Multinational companies have the opportunity to spread their debts across countries in the most efficient way by means of internal financing strategies. In high tax countries the deductibility of interest expenses is perceived to be most valuable. To contain the abusive use of debt financing, especially governments in high tax countries have implemented thin capitalization rules. These rules are disadvantageous for companies because they aim at limiting the deductibility of interest expenses from taxable income.

=== Transfer pricing rules ===
When enterprises enforce transactions with related companies they can set prices to shift profits to the entity in the country with the lowest tax burden. To ensure that these transactions are priced according to the arm's length principle, many countries tax authorities have implemented transfer pricing rules. Countries with specific rules on transfer pricing are less attractive from a corporate perspective because they provide less scope for profit shifting.

=== Treaty network ===
To avoid double taxation of profits from foreign sourced income double tax treaties are implemented. Furthermore, double tax treaties serve the purpose of lowering or even avoiding royalty payments and interest as well as on withholding taxes levied on distributed profits. This is a reason why companies are located in countries that have signed double tax treaties with many countries worldwide.

=== Withholding tax rate dividends ===
Withholding taxes on dividends grant the source country its share in tax revenue. From the perspective of a company, withholding taxes are disadvantageous. Profits are taxed again when they are distributed (in contrast to dividends that are not distributed across borders) even though they have already been subject to corporate taxation. Enterprises in countries with no/low withholding taxes are more attractive because they can distribute dividends with a lower tax burden.

=== Withholding tax rate interest ===
Withholding taxes on interest grants the source country its share in tax revenue. As tax interest payments to lenders are lowered on an after tax basis, withholding taxes are not attractive from the perspective of a company. Therefore, in countries with higher withholding tax rates lenders demand higher before tax interest rates from debtors. Enterprises in countries with low withholding taxes can raise foreign debt at lower cost.

=== Withholding tax rate royalties ===
Withholding taxes on royalties grants the source country its share in tax revenue. As tax royalty payments to licensors are lowered on an after tax basis, withholding taxes are not attractive from the perspective of a company. Therefore, in countries with higher withholding tax rates licensors demand higher before tax royalty rates from licensees. Enterprises in countries with low withholding taxes can license intellectual property at lower cost.

== Ranking ==
Rank	Country	Index	Rank	Country	Index	Rank	Country	Index	Rank	Country	Index
1	British Virgin Islands	0.90	26	Slovak Republic	0.50	51	Poland	0.40	76	Belarus	0.32
2	Bahamas	0.90	27	Lithuania	0.50	52	Finland	0.40	77	Dominican Republic	0.32
3	Bermuda	0.90	28	Sweden	0.49	53	Russia	0.4	78	Puerto Rico	0.31
4	Cayman Islands	0.88	29	Belgium	0.49	54	Lebanon	0.4	79	Zimbabwe	0.31
5	United Arab Emirates	0.87	30	Hong Kong	0.48	55	Costa Rica	0.38	80	New Zealand	0.31
6	Bahrain	0.86	31	France	0.48	56	Portugal	0.38	81	Japan	0.30
7	Guernsey	0.81	32	Czech Republic	0.45	57	Australia	0.38	82	Taiwan	0.30
8	Jersey	0.76	33	Saudi Arabia	0.45	58	Romania	0.38	83	Serbia	0.29
9	Malta	0.70	34	Slovenia	0.45	59	Algeria	0.37	84	Israel	0.28
10	Liechtenstein	0.66	35	Bulgaria	0.44	60	Pakistan	0.37	85	Angola	0.28
11	Netherlands	0.66	36	Nigeria	0.44	61	Panama	0.37	86	Philippines	0.26
12	Singapore	0.66	37	Spain	0.44	62	El Salvador	0.37	87	Bangladesh	0.25
13	Estonia	0.64	38	Germany	0.44	63	Vietnam	0.37	88	Korea	0.25
14	Luxembourg	0.63	39	Italy	0.43	64	Botswana	0.37	89	Brazil	0.24
15	Great Britain	0.62	40	South Africa	0.43	65	Ecuador	0.37	90	Colombia	0.24
16	Cyprus	0.61	41	Montenegro	0.43	66	Kenya	0.36	91	Mexico	0.24
17	Ireland	0.59	42	Ukraine	0.43	67	Turkey	0.36	92	Greece	0.24
18	Latvia	0.55	43	Denmark	0.43	68	Tunisia	0.36	93	China	0.23
19	Mauritius	0.55	44	Thailand	0.42	69	Uruguay	0.35	94	Egypt	0.22
20	Switzerland	0.55	45	Morocco	0.42	70	Kazhakhstan	0.35	95	United States	0.22
21	Austria	0.54	46	Croatia	0.41	71	Macedonia	0.34	96	Indonesia	0.21
22	Hungary	0.54	47	Nicaragua	0.41	72	Guatemala	0.34	97	Peru	0.15
23	Malaysia	0.54	48	Namibia	0.41	73	India	0.33	98	Argentina	0.13
24	Norway	0.52	49	Iceland	0.41	74	Canada	0.33	99	Venezuela	0.12
25	Paraguay	0.51	50	Bolivia	0.41	75	Chile	0.33	100	Netherlands Antilles	---

(Data 2014)

The ranking indicates that off-shore tax havens, such as Bermuda, the Bahamas, and the Cayman Islands provide very favorable tax conditions as reflected by high index values. However, some European countries, such as Luxembourg, Cyprus, the Netherlands, Ireland, and Malta achieve high index values as well. Surprisingly big industrial nations like the United States and China are in the bottom quartile.
