= Buffett =

Buffett is a surname of English origin. It was first recorded in Shropshire in 1273 where it was listed on the Hundred Rolls. The name is believed to have Norman origins.

Notable Buffetts include:

- Alice Buffett (1931–2017), Australian politician
- David Buffett (born 1942), Australian politician
- Doris Buffett (1928–2020), sister of Warren Buffett
- Ernest P. Buffett (1877–1946), American businessman, grandfather of Warren Buffett
- George D. Buffett (1928–2012), American politician, cousin of Warren Buffett
- Howard Buffett (1903–1964), American politician, father of Warren Buffett
- Howard Graham Buffett (born 1954), son of Warren Buffett
- Howard Warren Buffett (born 1983), son of Howard Graham Buffett and grandson of Warren Buffett
- Ivens Buffett (died 2004), Australian politician
- Jimmy Buffett (1946–2023), American singer-songwriter and musician
- Peter Buffett (born 1958), musician, son of Warren Buffett
- Robert Pitcairn Buffett (1830–1916), Chief Magistrate of the Pitcairn Islands
- Savannah Buffett (born 1979), American radio personality, daughter of Jimmy Buffett
- Susan Buffett (1932–2004), wife of Warren Buffett
- Susan Alice Buffett (born 1953), daughter of Warren Buffett
- Warren Buffett (born 1930), American investor and CEO of Berkshire Hathaway
