= Buffa (surname) =

Buffa is a surname. Notable people with the surname include:

- Annalisa Buffa (born 1973), Italian mathematician
- Ernst Buffa (1893–1971), German World War II Luftwaffe general
- Federico Buffa (born 1959), Italian journalist, writer, and television sportscaster
- Paolo Buffa (1903–1970), Italian architect and furniture designer

== See also ==
- Amédée Pofey or Buffa (fl. 1208), French knight, constable of the Kingdom of Thessalonica and grand constable of the Latin Empire of Constantinople
- Buffet (surname)
- Buffett
