= Howard Warren Buffett =

American academic

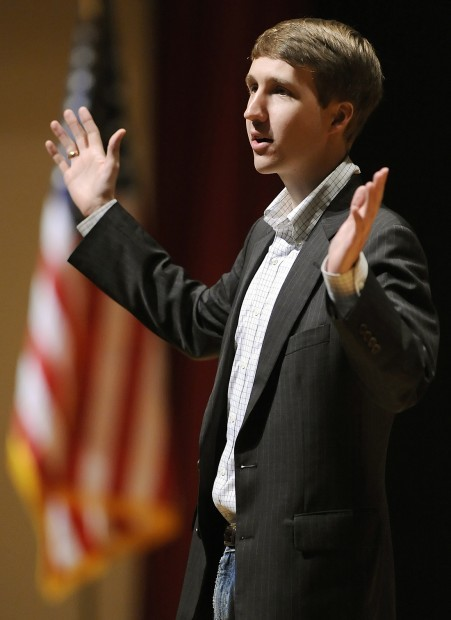
- Buffett in 2010
- Born: Howard Warren Buffett; October 14, 1983 (age 43); Omaha, Nebraska, U.S.
- Education: Northwestern University (BA); Columbia University (MPA)
- Occupations: Philanthropist, political consultant, political scientist, writer
- Political party: Democratic
- Spouse: Lili Thomas (m. 2011)
- Children: 1
- Parent(s): Howard Graham Buffett; Devon Goss
- Relatives: Warren Buffett (grandfather); Susan Thompson Buffett (grandmother); Susan Alice Buffett (aunt); Peter Buffett (uncle); Doris Buffett (paternal great-aunt); Howard Homan Buffett (great-grandfather); J. Schuyler Long (great-great-grandfather)
- Family: Buffett family

Howard Warren Buffett (born October 14, 1983) is an American philanthropist, political consultant, political scientist, and writer. A grandson of the American businessman and investor Warren Buffett, he is an adjunct professor in public policy and international affairs at Columbia University's School of International and Public Affairs and was previously the executive director of the Howard G. Buffett Foundation, a private philanthropic foundation that funds initiatives aimed at improving the standard of living and quality of life for the world’s most impoverished and marginalized populations. Buffett previously led agriculture-based economic stabilization and redevelopment programs in Iraq and Afghanistan while at the United States Department of Defense, and as a policy advisor in the Executive Office of the President of the United States under President Barack Obama.

Prior to joining the White House, Buffett served as a special assistant at the U.S. Department of Agriculture, as a member of the Office of the President-Elect, and as director of National Surrogate Radio for Obama for America.

== Biography ==
While he is associated with the Democratic Party, his father is a Republican.

Raised in Omaha, he attended Ponca Elementary School before moving to Decatur, Illinois, where he attended Mount Zion High School and was elected president of the local chapter of the National FFA Organization. He completed his Bachelor of Arts in Political Science and Communication Studies in 2006 at Northwestern University in Evanston, Illinois, where he also served as the student body vice president. He went on to receive a Master of Public Administration in Advanced Management and Finance at the School of International and Public Affairs, Columbia University in 2008.

== Career ==
=== Public service ===
In 2009, Buffett was appointed to the United States Department of Agriculture, where he served as a special assistant in the Office of the Secretary. There, he managed the national expansion strategy for the Department’s $480 million Cooperative Extension Service program. Additionally, he was charged with identifying strategic external partnerships aimed at advancing the core mission areas of research, education, and economics. He also served on the five-year Strategic Planning Initiative, and represented the department in the White House Innovation and Information Policy Working Group.

Upon completion of his service at the Department of Agriculture, Buffett served as a policy advisor in the Executive Office of the President of the United States at the White House, where he was responsible for the Cross-Sector Partnerships portfolio. In this role, he directed strategy development for cross-sector partnerships and innovation strategies aimed at enhancing collaboration between the White House, federal departments, agencies, corporations, nonprofits and foundations.

After leaving the White House, Buffett became the director of agriculture development at the Task Force for Business Stability Operations under the U.S. Department of Defense, where he was tasked with designing and implementing a strategy for agricultural development in Afghanistan and Iraq under the leadership of Paul Brinkley.

=== White House Energy Innovation Conference ===
In May 2010, Buffett spearheaded a White House Energy Innovation Conference focused on promoting partnerships. Represented at the event were four federal departments, three federal agencies, entrepreneurs, state government officials, academia, private sector leaders, nonprofits and innovators.

At the conference, the United States Department of Energy and the Small Business Administration jointly announced that both the Small Business Investment Company program and the Small Business Technology Transfer program would begin using their existing funding networks to promote small green energy firms through a new $60 million Business Clean Energy Innovation Fund. The event also served as the launch vehicle for the Regional Energy Innovation Conferences.

The first Regional Energy Innovation Conference was hosted in Omaha, Nebraska on June 17, 2010. The event focused on connecting entrepreneurs and small enterprise with representatives from organizations across sectors and was itself a partnership between the City of Omaha, The Gallup Organization, the Ewing Marion Kauffman Foundation, and the U.S. Department of Energy. Over one hundred local, regional, and national organizations were represented at Gallup University’s Omaha Campus to discuss issues ranging from regional gap funding and human capital needs to collaboration and the early adoption of energy innovation.

=== Social value investing ===
At the 2011 Social Good Summit in New York, Buffett introduced an approach premised on addressing social problems by systematically lining up nonprofits to each need.

On May 28, 2018, Buffett announced the release of his book titled Social Value Investing: A Management Framework for Effective Partnerships. Published by Columbia University Press, the book details specific case studies and examples on topics including clean energy, water scarcity and sustainable agriculture.

=== Advisory positions ===
In 2010, Buffett joined the advisory board for Toyota Motor North America. He chairs the advisory board for the Harvard University International Negotiation Program.

In 2023, he joined the Advisory Committee for the Jameel Index for Food Trade and Vulnerability Index which is a comprehensive index assessing countries’ food security vulnerability, designed to better understand and analyze food security, measure countries’ dependence on global food trade and imports, and assess how regional-scale threats might affect the ability to trade food goods across diverse geographic regions.

He previously served on the Board of Visitors for the Center on Philanthropy at Indiana University, and on the boards of New York Needs You and the Clark and Hinman Foundation. Additionally, he has served as an advisor to both the United Nations Office for Partnerships and the FEED Foundation.

He served as a judge for the Collaboration Prize, the American Express 2009 NGen Fellows Program, and the Network for Teaching Entrepreneurship’s business plan competitions.

He is an active member of the Nebraska Society and a lifetime alumni member of the Future Farmers of America (FFA).

=== Philanthropy ===
Buffett currently serves as the executive director of the Howard G. Buffett Foundation, a private family foundation focused on improving the standard of living and quality of life for the world’s most impoverished and marginalized populations. He has engaged in the humanitarian and agriculture development efforts of the Foundation worldwide.

Buffett also sits on the board of Doris Buffett's Learning By Giving Foundation. He has referred to Learning by Giving as the first step in the implementation of the Social Value Investment model, "By simply empowering students to become problem solvers in their own communities, we maximize the impact of our efforts, encourage innovation, and inspire life-long engagements with philanthropy."

=== Professor ===
In the fall of 2013, Buffett served as a co-professor teaching an Innovations of Public Management class at his alma mater at the School of International and Public Affairs at Columbia University. Buffett taught the course with program head William Eimicke, and is currently an adjunct associate professor and research scholar at the school, teaching philanthropy, social value investing, and management innovation.

== Personal life ==
He is married to Lili Thomas Buffett, a Columbia University graduate whom he met at an agricultural conference, and the couple has a son, Thomas. They split their time between Omaha, Nebraska, and Decatur, Illinois.

Buffett operates a 160-ha no-till farm near Tekamah, Nebraska.

Buffett is a published photographer. His work has appeared in National Geographic, World Wide Fund for Nature, and Encyclopedia of Earth.
