= Buffet (disambiguation) =

A buffet is a meal laid out on a table or sideboard so that guests may serve themselves.

Buffet may also refer to:

== People ==
- Buffet (surname)

== Arts, entertainment, and media ==
- The Buffet (Chardin), a 1728 painting by Jean Siméon Chardin
- The Buffet (play), a 1968 Egyptian play by Ali Salem
- The Buffet, a 2015 album by R. Kelly

== Brands and enterprises ==
- Buffet Crampon, a manufacturer of musical instruments
- Buffets, Inc., American restaurant company, now known as Ovation Brands

== Other uses ==
- Buffet car
- Buffeting, aerodynamic turbulence on a fixed-wing aircraft prior to and during a stall
- Sideboard, a piece of furniture, often called a buffet
- Strike (attack), or buffet, to strike repeatedly and violently

== See also ==
- Phoebe Buffay and her twin Ursula, fictional characters on Friends and Mad About You
- Smorgasbord (disambiguation)
