= Peter Buffett discography =

- Studio albums: 17
- EPs: 2
- Compilation albums: 14
- Singles: 33
- With Comet9: 1
- Production: 9

The discography of Peter Buffett, an American musician, composer, author and philanthropist, consists of seventeen studio albums, two EPs, over thirty singles, and fourteen releases from compilations with other artists.

== Studio albums ==
Year	Title
1987	The Waiting: Released: Label: Narada
1989	One by One: Released: Label: Narada
1991	Lost Frontier: Released: Label: Narada
1992	Yonnondio: Released: Label: Narada
1994	500 Nations - A Musical Journey: Released: Label: Epic
1997	Spirit Dance: Released: Label: Hollywood Records
1998	Spirit - A Journey in Dance Drums & Song: Released: Label: Hollywood Records
1998	Wisconsin: An American Portrait: Released: Label: BeSide Records
2000	Triathlon: Through The Eyes of the Elite: Released: Label: BeSide Records
2002	Ojibwe - We Look In All Directions: Released: Label: BisonHead Records
2004	Star Of Wonder _{(feat. Kim Robertson)}: Released: Label: BeSide Records
2005	Spirit - The Seventh Fire: Released: Label: BisonHead Records
2006	Inside Looking Out: Released: Label: BeSide Records
2006	Gold Star: Released: Label: BeSide Records
2007	Staring at the Sun: Released: Label: BeSide Records
2008	Imaginary Kingdom: Released: Label: BeSide Records
2011	Running Blind (Collection of singles): Released: Label: BeSide Records

== EPs ==
Year	Title
1997	Recombination: Released: February 25, 1997; Label: Hollywood Records; Format: CD
2012	Live: Released: Label: BeSide Records; Format:

== Singles ==
Year	Song
2007	"Anything" _{(Feat. Akon)}
2009	"Blood Into Gold" _{(Feat. Akon)}
2009	"The Cut"
2009	"The Way"
2009	"Running Blind"
2009	"Amarcord"
2009	"Losing My Grip"
2009	"Dissolve The Disguise"
2010	"(no more) Killing Time"
2010	"A Song For Everyone" _{(Feat. Angélique Kidjo)}
2010	"Bought & Sold"
2010	"This Divide"
2010	"Plastic Tomb"
2010	"Last Call"
2010	"All The Noise"
2010	"If I Could Hold You"
2010	"Signs"
2010	"Right Here. All The Time"
2010	"Break The Fall"
2012	"I Won't Let Go"
2012	"Without You"
2012	"May Day"
2012	"Magic Words"
2012	"Blind, Deaf and Done"
2012	"How Would You Know?"
2012	"Room Enough"
2012	"Butterfly"
2012	"It's The End of the World As We Know It (And I Feel Fine)" _{(R.E.M. cover)}
2013	"(how you want it) To Be"
2013	"Silence Broken"
2013	"Already Flown"
2014	"Shout (Tears for Fears song)" _{(Tears for Fears cover)}
2014	"Cherry Blossom"
2015	"Poison the River"

== With Comet9 ==
Year	Title	Label
1998	Like Mercury	Don't Records

== Compilations ==
Year	Song(s)	Album	Ref.
1988	“The Waiting”, “Empire Builder”	The Narada Collection, Vol. 1	
1988	“What Child Is This? (Greensleeves)”	The Narada Christmas Collection	
1989	“Trail of Tears”	The Narada Collection, Vol. 2	
1990	“Northern Morning”	The Narada Wilderness Collection	
1990	“One More Time”, “One By One”	Narada Mystique: Sampler One	
1990	“Yonnondio, Pt. 1”, “Yonnondio, Pt. 2”	Camelot Music/Narada Sampler	
1992	“O Holy Night”	Narada Christmas Collection, Vol. 2	
1993	“Yonnondio, Pt. 1”, “Nebraska”	The Narada Collection, Vol. 4	
1993	“The Waiting”	Narada Decade: The Anniversary Collection	
1995	"Main Title/The Arrival/Search For Home" “The Bird/The Swimmer” w/John Barry	The Scarlet Letter Soundtrack	
1995	“Fire Dance”	Dances With Wolves Soundtrack (Re-release)	
1996	“Nez Perce”	Songs of the Spirit	
2001	“Matter Of Time”, “Who I Am”, “Touch The Clouds”, “Sugar Baby”, “Cocktails for Two”, “Still”, “No Goodbye”	Songs from an Eastside Attic	
2001	“Yonnondio, Pt. 1”	Narada Decade, Vol. 2: Evolution 1992-2001	

== Production ==
Year	Artist	Title	Role
1985	Michel Genest	Ascension	Editing, Effects Pedals, Engineer, Mastering, Programming, Sampling
1988	Michel Genest and Anton Mizerak	Riddle of the Sphinx	Engineer
1988	Wilson Steward	Luna	Pre-Production Coordinator
1989	Doug Cameron	Mil Amores	Executive Producer
1990	Narada	Equinox Sampler, Vol. 2	Executive Producer
1990	Rob Mounsey & Flying Monkey Orchestra	Dig	Executive Producer
1996	Kim Robertson	Wood, Fire & Gold	Engineer, Mixing
1998	Douglas Spotted Eagle	Pray	Producer
2001	Kim Robertson	Dance to Your Shadow	Mixing, Programming
