= 1950 United States House of Representatives elections in Nebraska =

- November 7, 1950

All 4 Nebraska seats to the United States House of Representatives
	Majority party	Minority party
Party	Republican	Democratic
Last election	4	0
Seats won	3	0
Seat change	▲1	▼1
Popular vote	271,840	164,490
Percentage	62.30%	37.70%

The 1950 United States House of Representatives elections in Nebraska were held on November 7, 1950, to elect the state of Nebraska's four members to the United States House of Representatives. Incumbent Republican Congressmen Carl Curtis, Karl Stefan, and Arthur L. Miller won re-election, while Democratic Congressman Eugene D. O'Sullivan lost re-election to former Congressman Howard Buffett.

== Overview ==
1950 United States House of Representatives elections in Nebraska
Party	Votes	Percentage	Seats	+/–
Republican	271,840	62.30%	4	▲1
Democratic	164,490	37.70%	0	▼1
Totals	436,330	100.00%	4	—

== District 1 ==
Incumbent Republican Congressman Carl Curtis ran for re-election to a seventh term. He won the Republican primary against University of Nebraska professor Joseph Alexis, and faced former Lincoln Mayor Clarence G. Miles, the Democratic nominee, in the general election. Curtis defeated Miles to win re-election, receiving 55 percent of the vote to Miles's 45 percent.

=== Republican primary ===
==== Candidates ====
- Carl Curtis, incumbent U.S. Representative
- Joseph Alexis, University of Nebraska professor

==== Results ====
Republican primary results
Party	Candidate	Votes	%
Republican	Carl T. Curtis (inc.)	30,209	74.23%
Republican	Joseph Alexis	10,487	25.77%
Total votes		40,696	100.00%

=== Democratic primary ===
==== Candidates ====
- Clarence G. Miles, former Mayor of Lincoln
- Samuel Freeman, 1938 Democratic gubernatorial candidate
- A. Edward Neiden, grocer

==== Results ====
Democratic primary results
Party	Candidate	Votes	%
Democratic	Clarence G. Miles	13,261	70.03%
Democratic	Samuel Freeman	3,394	17.92%
Democratic	A. Edward Neiden	2,280	12.04%
Total votes		18,935	100.00%

=== General election ===
==== Candidates ====
- Carl Curtis (Republican)
- Clarence G. Miles (Democratic)

==== Results ====
1950 Nebraska's 1st congressional district general election results
Party	Candidate	Votes	%
Republican	Carl Curtis (inc.)	67,164	54.54%
Democratic	Clarence G. Miles	55,972	45.46%
Total votes		123,136	100.00%
Republican hold			

== District 2 ==
Incumbent Democratic Congressman Eugene D. O'Sullivan ran for re-election to a second term. He was challenged by former Republican Congressman Howard Buffett, whom he had defeated in 1948. Buffett defeated O'Sullivan in a landslide, winning 63 percent of the vote to O'Sullivan's 37 percent.

=== Republican primary ===
==== Candidates ====
- Howard Buffett, former U.S. Representative
- George J. Thomas, candy distributor
- John McKernan, real estate broker

==== Results ====
Republican primary results
Party	Candidate	Votes	%
Republican	Howard Buffett	22,849	78.14%
Republican	George J. Thomas	4,101	14.03%
Republican	John McKernan	2,290	7.83%
Total votes		29,240	100.00%

=== Democratic primary ===
==== Candidates ====
- Eugene D. O'Sullivan, incumbent U.S. Representative

==== Results ====
Democratic primary results
Party	Candidate	Votes	%
Democratic	Eugene D. O'Sullivan (inc.)	28,236	100.00%
Total votes		28,236	100.00%

=== General election ===
==== Candidates ====
- Howard Buffett (Republican)
- Eugene D. O'Sullivan (Democratic)

==== Results ====
1950 Nebraska's 2nd congressional district general election results
Party	Candidate	Votes	%
Republican	Howard Buffett	71,126	63.47%
Democratic	Eugene D. O'Sullivan (inc.)	40,939	36.53%
Total votes		112,065	100.00%
Republican gain from Democratic			

== District 3 ==
Incumbent Republican Congressman Karl Stefan ran for re-election to a ninth term. He was challenged by attorney Duane K. Peterson, the Democratic nominee. He won re-election in a landslide, winning 67 percent of the vote to Peterson's 33 percent. However, Stefan did not end up serving a full term; he died on October 2, 1951, triggering a special election.

=== Republican primary ===
==== Candidates ====
- Karl Stefan, incumbent U.S. Representative

==== Results ====
Republican primary results
Party	Candidate	Votes	%
Republican	Karl Stefan (inc.)	25,325	100.00%
Total votes		25,325	100.00%

=== Democratic primary ===
==== Candidates ====
- Duane K. Peterson, attorney

==== Results ====
Democratic primary results
Party	Candidate	Votes	%
Democratic	Duane K. Peterson	13,721	100.00%
Total votes		13,721	100.00%

=== General election ===
==== Candidates ====
- Karl Stefan (Republican)
- Duane K. Peterson (Democratic)

==== Results ====
1950 Nebraska's 3rd congressional district general election results
Party	Candidate	Votes	%
Republican	Karl Stefan (inc.)	68,889	66.94%
Democratic	Duane K. Peterson	34,017	33.06%
Total votes		102,906	100.00%
Republican hold			

== District 4 ==
Incumbent Republican Congressman Arthur L. Miller ran for re-election to a fifth term. He won the Republican primary against Sidney City Attorney Hammond McNish and faced Gering City Attorney Hans J. Holtorf, the Democratic nominee, in the general election. He won re-election in a landslide, winning 66 percent of the vote to Holtorf's 34 percent.

=== Republican primary ===
==== Candidates ====
- Arthur L. Miller, incumbent U.S. Representative
- Hammond McNish, Sidney City Attorney

==== Results ====
Republican primary results
Party	Candidate	Votes	%
Republican	Arthur L. Miller (inc.)	23,738	79.35%
Republican	Hammond McNish	6,176	20.65%
Total votes		29,914	100.00%

=== Democratic primary ===
==== Candidates ====
- Hans J. Holtorf, Jr., Gering City Attorney

==== Results ====
Democratic primary results
Party	Candidate	Votes	%
Democratic	Hans J. Holtorf, Jr.	12,974	100.00%
Total votes		12,974	100.00%

=== General election ===
==== Candidates ====
- Arthur L. Miller (Republican)
- Hans J. Holtorf, Jr. (Democratic)

==== Results ====
1950 Nebraska's 4th congressional district general election results
Party	Candidate	Votes	%
Republican	Arthur L. Miller (inc.)	64,661	65.83%
Democratic	Hans J. Holtorf, Jr.	33,562	34.17%
Total votes		98,223	100.00%
Republican hold			

== See also ==
- 1950 United States House of Representatives elections
