= Omaha Central High School =

Public school in Omaha, Nebraska, United States

- Omaha Central High School in 2021

Location
- 124 N 20th St; Omaha, (Douglas County), Nebraska; United States; 41°15′38″N 95°56′37″W

Information
- Type: Public school
- Established: c. 1887
- Teaching staff: 187.60 (FTE)
- Grades: 9–12
- Enrollment: 2,674 (2023–2024)
- Student to teacher ratio: 36.36
- Colors: Purple and white
- Team name: Eagles

Omaha Central High School, originally known as Omaha High School, is a fully accredited public high school located in downtown Omaha, Nebraska, United States. It is one of many public high schools located in Omaha. As of the 2023–2024 academic year, Omaha Central had an enrollment of 2,674 students.

The current building, located in Downtown Omaha, was designed by John Latenser, Sr. and was built between 1900 and 1912. It is the oldest active high school building in the city.

== History ==
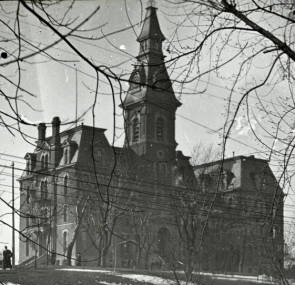
The school in the 1890s

On November 10, 1859, Omaha Central High School began as Omaha High School in the Nebraska Territory capitol building. In 1869, after the territorial government was removed from Omaha and moved to Lincoln, the capitol building was donated to the City of Omaha by the Nebraska state government for educational use only. In 1870, it was demolished. In 1872, it was replaced by a four-story building that hosted kindergarten through twelfth grades, designed by Gurdon P. Randall in the Second Empire style.

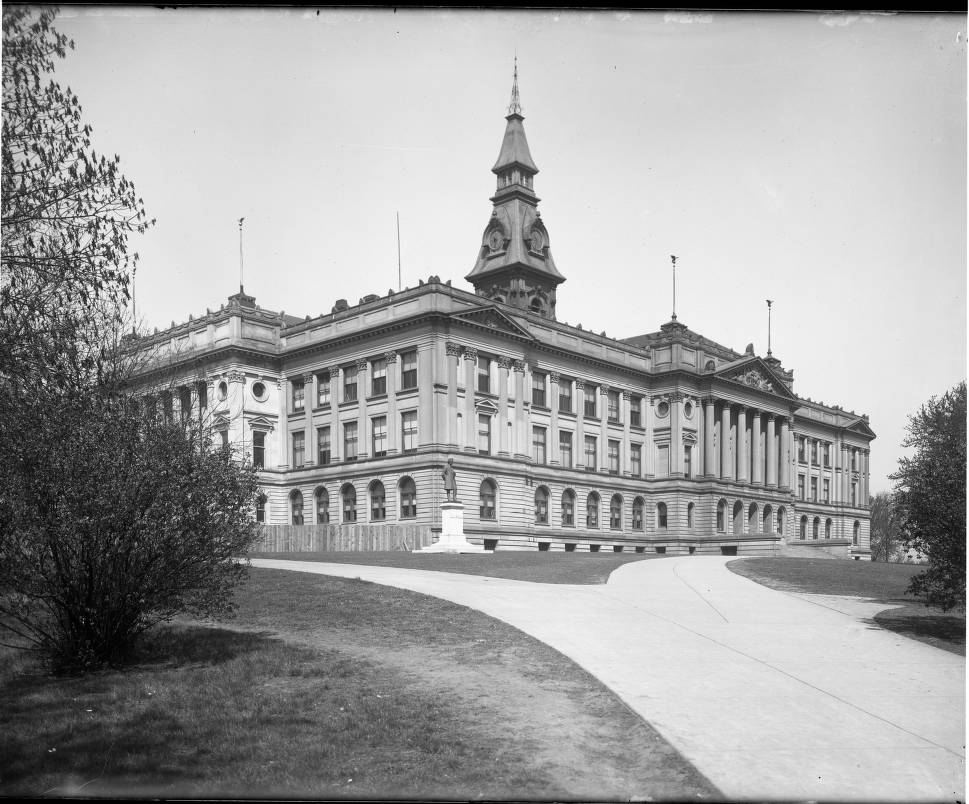
The east wing of the new Central High School built directly in front of the previous facade, c. 1909.

In 1900, a new building was begun that encircled the second school, which was dismantled by 1912. Kindergarten through eighth grade were moved to the neighboring Central Elementary School. A gym was added to Central in 1930, and this building is still in use today.

== Extracurricular activities ==
=== Athletics ===
The Eagles compete in Class A, the largest classification in Nebraska according to the Nebraska School Activities Association. Throughout its history, Omaha Central has won numerous state championships in various sports. Many graduates have gone on to participate in collegiate athletics. The football and soccer teams compete at Seemann Stadium located on campus. The boys' and girls' basketball games and volleyball matches are played at the Central High gymnasium. The baseball and softball teams compete at Boyd Stadium, a renovated park three miles (5 km) northeast of the campus.

In 2007, the Eagles became the only high school in Nebraska to have won championships in three main sports in the same calendar year. As a result, Central was ranked by Sports Illustrated as one of the top 10 high-school athletic programs in the country.

==== State championships ====
State championships
Season	Sport	Number of championships	Year
Fall	Football	3	1960, 1984, 2007
Fall	Cross country, boys'	2	1965, 1972
Fall	Tennis, boys'	4	1967, 1968, 1969, 1985
Winter	Wrestling, boys'	12	1939, 1940, 1941, 1942, 1944, 1945, 1946, 1947, 1949, 1950, 1954, 1955
Winter	Basketball, boys'	10	1912, 1974, 1975, 2006, 2007, 2008, 2010, 2011, 2012, 2013
Winter	Basketball, girls'	3	1983, 1984, 2012
Winter	Powerlifting, boys'	3	2020, 2021, 2022
Winter	Powerlifting, girls'	5	2018, 2019, 2020, 2021, 2022
Spring	Baseball	1	1939
Spring	Golf, boys'	5	1929, 1930, 1936, 1951, 1956
Spring	Track and field, boys'	21	1909, 1910, 1911, 1912, 1914, 1915, 1916, 1922, 1924, 1945, 1958, 1959, 1961, 1965, 1966, 1982, 1983, 1989, 2007, 2010, 2011
Spring	Track and field, girls	11	1974, 1979, 1980, 1981, 1983, 1984, 1986, 1987, 1988, 1989, 1990
Spring	Soccer, boys'	1	1992
	Tennis, girls	1	1975
Total		78	

=== Newspaper and media ===
The high school's newspaper is The Register. In 1986 Quill and Scroll officially declared The Register the oldest continuously published newspaper west of the Mississippi.

After running a controversial story in 2001, the staff and the paper were rebuked by the administration. The story reported on a football player continuing to play, despite two assault charges. The charges, as stated in the school's handbook, should have led to a dismissal from the team. After running the story, the paper was threatened with being shut down. The school advisor received support from media outlets on the local and national level. This support stopped the paper from being shut down.

The staff of Central's student newspaper, were awarded the Student Press Review's Edmund J. Sullivan Award in 2002 after they wrote a series of articles exposing several controversial topics throughout the school. After the administration again threatened the paper with closure, the students won reprieve through the support of professional journalists across the country.

Central has had youth-led media for some years. Starting in 1923, it had a high school radio station for five years. First, KFCZ operated during the 1923–1924 school year. In 1925 the call letters changed to KOCH, and the Central High School Radio Club presented shows throughout the school day and special events on the weekends. The station was ordered discontinued by the Federal Communications Commission in 1928, as they devalued the purpose of school-affiliated radio stations and rescinded their licenses across the United States.

Central also had, starting in 1969, a student-run radio station, KIOS-FM (91.5 MHz), which operated during the 1969–1973 school years. In 1973 the radio station was moved to Benson High School, and later to the old Tech High location, where it is still in operation.

KIOS-FM (91.5 MHz) is a National Public Radio member station in Omaha, owned and operated by Omaha Public Schools.

=== JROTC ===
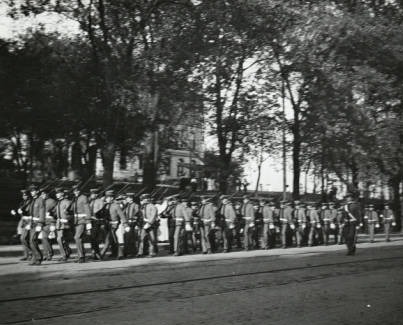
Cadets marching circa 1900-1910

The Military Science program at Omaha Central High School predates the JROTC program. It began in the 1892–1893 school year. It became the most popular activity at the school. Initially, all male students were required to participate.

== Notable alumni ==
=== Arts ===
- Erin Belieu, National Poetry Series winning poet; editor; founder of VIDA: Women in Literary Arts
- Lindsay Bloom, actress
- Henry Fonda, Academy Award-winning actor
- Terry Goodkind, author
- Aaron Marcus, Princeton University graduate, computer graphics designer
- Zahn McClarnon, actor
- Dorothy McGuire, Academy Award-nominated actress
- Jay Milder, expressionist painter
- Dan Mirvish (1985), American filmmaker
- Tillie Olsen, writer and activist
- Inga Swenson, actress
- Joan Micklin Silver, film director

=== Business ===
- Susan Alice Buffett, daughter of Warren Buffett; philanthropist
- Susan Thompson Buffett, mother of Susie Buffett, former wife of Warren Buffett; former president of the Buffett Foundation
- Peter Kiewit, founder of the Kiewit Corporation, one of the world's largest construction companies
- Charlie T. Munger (1924 – 2023), billionaire investor and Warren Buffett partner
- Gerry Thomas, inventor of the TV dinner in 1952

=== Military and politics ===
- Brenda Council, long-time North Omaha city councilwoman
- James W. Fous, Vietnam War veteran; recipient of the Medal of Honor award
- Peter Hoagland, politician who represented the 2nd Congressional District of Nebraska in the United States House of Representatives
- Jarvis Offutt, American World War I aviator, namesake of Offutt Air Force Base
- Seth Rich, employee of Democratic National Committee murdered in 2016
- William Marshall Roark, US Navy lieutenant killed in Vietnam; namesake of the USS Roark
- Robert F. Schoultz (1942), US Navy aviator and vice admiral
- Kenneth C. Stephan, justice of the Nebraska Supreme Court
- Doris Stevens, women's suffrage leader
- Edward Zorinsky, Omaha mayor and Nebraska senator

=== Music ===
- Peter Buffett, son of Susan and Warren Buffett; musician
- Annunciata Garrotto, soprano
- Wynonie Harris, rhythm & blues singer with 15 top 10 hits

=== Sciences ===
- Alan J. Heeger, 2000 Nobel Prize winner in Chemistry
- John L. Holland, psychologist who developed The Holland Codes
- Lawrence R. Klein, 1980 Nobel Prize winner in Economic Science
- Saul A. Kripke, philosopher and Princeton University professor
- Gerald Weinberg, computer scientist and prolific author

=== Sports ===
- Kimera Bartee, Major League Baseball player (Detroit Tigers, Cincinnati Reds, Colorado Rockies)
- Jason Brilz, mixed martial arts fighter
- Dwaine Dillard, professional basketball player
- Ahman Green, football player
- Harland Gunn, National Football League player
- Tra-Deon Hollins, NBA G League player
- Calvin Jones, football player
- Keith Jones, football player
- Joe Orduna, National Football League player
- Jed Ortmeyer, National Hockey League player
- Shaun Prater, National Football League player
- Chris Reed, National Football League player
- Bobby Robertson, football player
- Gale Sayers, Pro Football Hall of Fame running back depicted in the movie Brian's Song
- Larry Station, National Football League player
- Tre'Shawn Thurman, NBA G League player
- John Tonje, college basketball player
- Pat Venditte, Major League Baseball player
- Brandon Williams, National Football League player

== Former principals ==
The list of principals of Omaha High School/Central dates from 1870 to present.

- John Kellom, 1870–1875
- W. H. Merritt, 1875–1877
- C. H. Crawford, 1877–1881
- Charles Hine, 1881–1882
- Homer Lewis, 1882–1896
- Irwen Leviston, 1896–1899
- A. H. Waterhouse, 1899–1908
- E. U. Graff, 1908–1911
- Kate McHugh, 1911–1914
- Clayton Reed, 1914–1915
- Joseph G. Masters, 1915–1939
- Fred Hill, 1939–1944
- J. Arthur Nelson, 1944–1968
- Gaylord “Doc” Moller, 1968–1995
- Gary L. Thompson, 1995–2002
- Jerry F. Bexten, 2002–2006
- Gregory Emmel, 2006–2010
- Keith Bigsby, 2010-2013
- Ed Bennett, 2013-2021
- Dionne Kirksey, 2021-2026
- Eric Behrens, 2026-

== See also ==
- Omaha Public Schools
