= Peter Buffett =

American musician

- Born: Peter Andrew Buffett; May 4, 1958 (age 68); Omaha, Nebraska, U.S.
- Education: Omaha Central High School
- Alma mater: Stanford University
- Occupations: Musician, composer, author, philanthropist
- Years active: 1980s–present
- Spouses: Mary Buffett (m. 1981; div. 1993) Jennifer Buffett (m. 1996)
- Children: 2
- Parent(s): Warren Buffett; Susan Thompson
- Relatives: Howard Buffett (grandfather); Leila Stahl Buffett (grandmother); Susan Alice Buffett (sister); Howard Graham Buffett (brother); Howard Warren Buffett (nephew); Doris Buffett (Aunt)
- Website: peterbuffett.com

Peter Andrew Buffett (born May 4, 1958) is an American musician, composer, author and philanthropist. With a career that spans more than 30 years, Buffett is a Regional Emmy Award winner, New York Times best-selling author and co-chair of the NoVo Foundation. He is the youngest child of billionaire investor Warren Buffett.

== Career ==
=== Early career ===
Buffett began his musical career in the early part of the 1980s in San Francisco, California. After dropping out of Stanford University, he used the proceeds of his inheritance from the sale of his grandfather's farm to pursue a career in music. He recorded and produced albums for local talent. His big break came when a neighbor introduced him to his son-in-law who needed ad tunes for a newly conceived station, MTV. The music channel became a cultural phenomenon in the 1980s. He also was hired by ad agencies to compose commercials and logos - including CNN, which like MTV was also new to cable television at the time.

=== Music career ===
==== 1987–1995 ====
Buffett decided to transition from advertising to music and he decided that a way to do that is to get a record deal based on movie scores. As new age music was popular in the mid-1980s, he was able to secure one. Narada Productions, a new-age music recording company, signed Buffett to a recording contract. In 1987, Buffett debuted with Narada, releasing an album entitled The Waiting. His second album, One by One, was inspired by Evan S. Connell's book "Son of the Morning Star". In 1989, Buffett moved to Milwaukee, home of Narada Productions and closer to his childhood home in Omaha, Nebraska. Buffett would release two more albums with Narada: Lost Frontier and Yonnondio.

While with Narada, Buffett had his first major success scoring the "Fire Dance" scene in the film Dances with Wolves. The film score, composed by John Barry, won the Academy Award for Best Original Score. Barry would later invite Buffett to collaborate with him again, this time at the Abbey Road Studios in London. Buffett contributed the Indigenous soundscapes to the film, and went on to compose two songs for the soundtrack of The Scarlet Letter.

After the release of Yonnondio, Buffett signed with Epic Records. In 1994, he released his soundtrack for the CBS miniseries 500 Nations, which was produced by Kevin Costner.

==== 1996–2005 ====
In 1996, Buffett produced Star of Wonder, a Christmas CD featuring Celtic harpist Kim Robertson and arranger Eric Segnitz. Buffett then signed with Hollywood Records, which released his album Spirit Dance in 1997.

In 1998, he entered the pop music realm with the release of Comet9's "Like Mercury" on Milwaukee-based independent label Don't Records, with Buffett producing, writing and playing multi-instrumentals. Co-writer and guitarist Tom Nelson and vocalist Susan Zielke completed the studio trio, with Citizen King members D. J. Brooks and Malcolm Michiles guesting on drums and turntables, respectively. The live band added bassist Josh Warner to the lineup.

In 1999, Buffett's score for the documentary Wisconsin: An American Portrait won a Chicago / Midwest Emmy Award for Best Soundtrack.

Also in 1999, Buffett's Spirit – A Journey in Dance Drums and Song aired on PBS as a highly successful pledge break special. Combining modern and American Indian dancers with director and choreographer Wayne Cilento, Spirit went on to tour through the end of 1999. In 2004, Buffett worked with Jody Ripplinger and Frank Anderson to create Spirit –The Seventh Fire; an updated version of his earlier show. It was premiered on the National Mall during the opening of the Smithsonian National Museum of the American Indian in its 800-seat theater tent.

==== 2006–present ====
In 2006, Buffett released his first vocal album, Gold Star. Over the course of the next two years, he released two more albums, Staring at the Sun (2007) and Imaginary Kingdom (2008) on his own label, BeSide Records.

In 2009, Buffett began to release exclusive singles through his social networking community on Ning. He has released over 25 singles since then, including a compilation album of fifteen of the songs. The collection, released initially as a USB album, was titled Running Blind (2011) and contained an innovative interactive environment.

During this time he collaborated twice with Grammy-nominated recording artist Akon and once with Grammy-winning artist Angélique Kidjo on human rights-inspired songs. One Akon collaboration, titled “Blood Into Gold,” debuted at a special event at the UN General Assembly in March 2009 that focused on human trafficking.

In 2013, Buffett released "Already Flown", which was the inspiration behind his New York Times op-ed piece, The Charitable-Industrial Complex. The piece sparked a lively debate on the role of philanthropy.

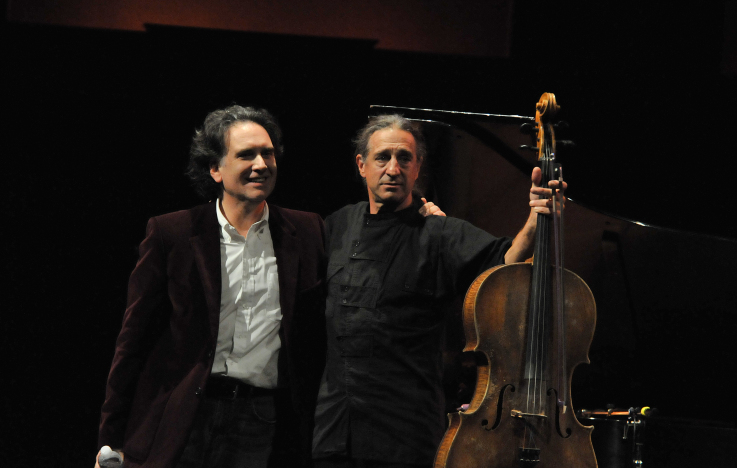
Peter Buffett and Michael Kott performing a Concert & Conversation at the Vancouver Peace Summit in 2009

=== Concert and conversation ===
Peter, along with cellist Michael Kott, is currently touring around the world in support of his Life Is What You Make It: A Concert & Conversation with Peter Buffett performance. Buffett continues to visit numerous university campuses, community foundations and other organizations using his own life story and experiences as illustration. He discusses how important it is for each person to define his or her own path, regardless of their wealth or background, and ultimately conveys that it’s one's values — and what we are able to give back to society — that shape and define us as individuals.

=== Author ===
In May 2010, his book Life Is What You Make It: Find Your Own Path to Fulfillment was published with Random House/Crown Publishing. The book was praised by Ted Turner, former President Bill Clinton, Bill and Melinda Gates, and Gloria Steinem, among others. It has sold over half a million copies worldwide, peaking at number four on The New York Times Best Sellers List. It has been available in over fifteen languages. Buffett appeared on NPR, as well as The Today Show and CBS Sunday Morning with his father, to discuss the book.

In 2013, Buffett began contributing essays to the Huffington Post Impact blog.

== Work with other artists ==
During the 1980s, Buffett was the sound engineer on three albums by Pauline Anna Strom, which included Plot Zero.

== Personal life ==
=== Family ===
Peter Buffett was born in Omaha, Nebraska, and is the youngest child of investor Warren Buffett and Susan Thompson Buffett. He has two siblings: sister Susie and brother Howard. Buffett graduated from Omaha Central High School and attended Stanford University.

He was married to his first wife, Mary Buffett, for 12 years before they divorced in 1993. Mary's twin daughters from a previous relationship, Erica and Nicole, were four years old at the time of their wedding. Subsequently, Peter Buffett legally adopted the girls. He married Jennifer Buffett in June 1996.

=== Philanthropy ===
Buffett and his wife co-chair the NoVo Foundation, an organization that aims to empower and reduce violence against girls and women.

In a 2013 New York Times op-ed and radio podcast, The Charitable-Industrial Complex, Peter Buffett used the terms "philanthropic colonialism" and "conscience laundering," and described his insights into "searching for answers with their right hand to problems that others in the room have created with their left" rather than systemic change.

== Discography ==
- The Waiting (1987)
- One by One (1989)
- Lost Frontier (1991)
- Yonnondio (1992)
- 500 Nations - A Musical Journey (1994)
- Spirit Dance (1997)
- Spirit - A Journey in Dance Drums & Song (1998)
- Wisconsin: An American Portrait (1998)
- Triathlon: Through the Eyes of the Elite (2000)
- Ojibwe - We Look In All Directions (2002)
- Star Of Wonder Feat. Kim Robertson (2004)
- Spirit - The Seventh Fire (2005)
- Inside Looking Out (2006)
- Gold Star (2006)
- Staring at the Sun (2007)
- Imaginary Kingdom (2008)
- Running Blind (2011)

== See also ==
- List of ambient music artists
