= Howard Graham Buffett =

American businessman (born 1954)

Howard Buffett
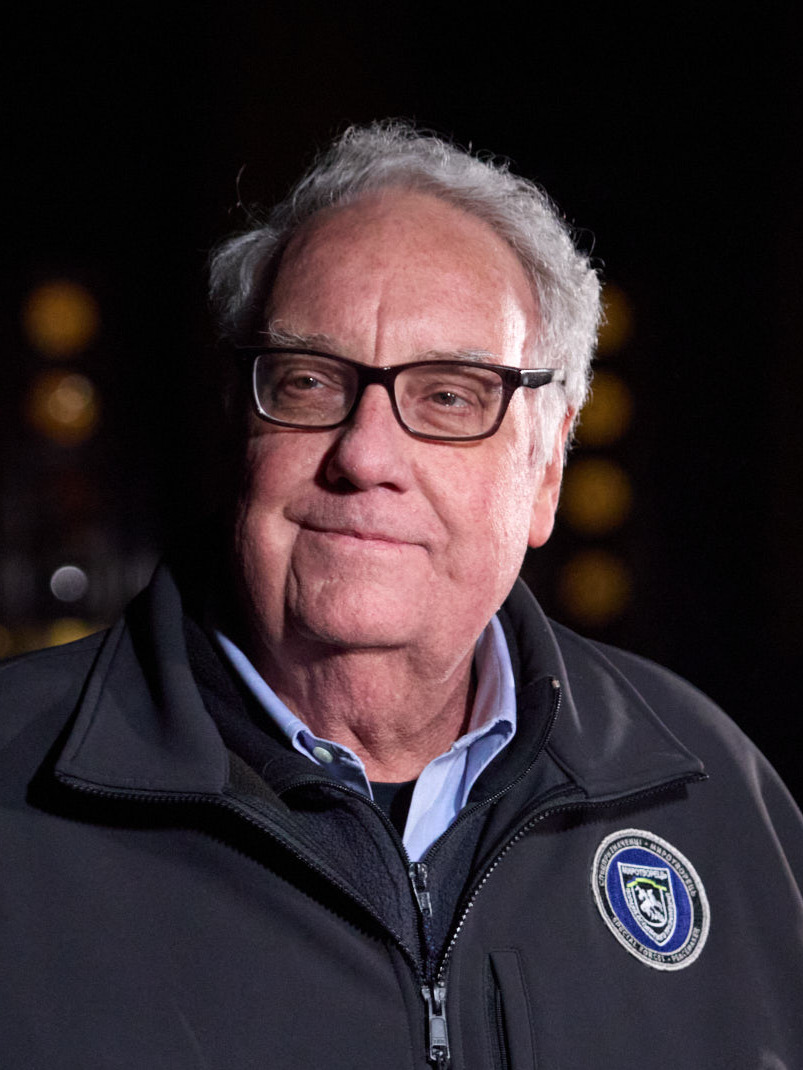
- Buffet in December 2023

Sheriff of Macon County, Illinois
- In office September 2017 – November 2018
- Preceded by: Thomas Schneider
- Succeeded by: Antonio D. Brown

County Commissioner for Douglas County, Nebraska
- In office 1989–1992

Personal details
- Born: Howard Graham Buffett; December 16, 1954 (age 71)
- Party: Republican
- Spouses: Marcia Duncan (divorced); Devon Morse
- Relations: Buffett family
- Children: Howard Warren Buffett
- Parents: Warren Buffett; Susan Thompson
- Relatives: Howard Buffett (grandfather); William Hertzog Thompson (grandfather); Susan Alice Buffett (sister); Peter Buffett (brother); Doris Buffett (aunt)

Howard Graham Buffett (born December 16, 1954) is an American businessman, former politician, philanthropist, photographer, farmer, and conservationist. He is the middle child of billionaire investor Warren Buffett. He is named after Howard Buffett, his grandfather, and Benjamin Graham, Warren Buffett's favorite professor.

== Personal life ==
Howard G. Buffett grew up in Omaha, Nebraska, with two siblings – older sister Susan and younger brother Peter. He has been active in business, politics, agriculture, conservation, photography, and philanthropy. In August 1977, he married Marcia Sue Duncan. Also in 1977, he began farming in Tekamah, Nebraska. His father purchased the property for $760,000 and charged him rent.

Buffett later married Devon Morse, born Devon Armour Goss. They had a son, Howard Warren Buffett, who was born on October 14, 1983. Buffett currently resides in Decatur, Illinois, from where he oversees a 1,500-acre (6.1 km^{2}) family farm in Pana, Illinois, and three foundation-operated research farms, including over 1,500 acres in Arizona, and 9,200 acres in South Africa. He is an advocate of no-till conservation agriculture.

== Business ==
Buffett was Corporate Vice President and Assistant to the Chairman of Archer Daniels Midland Company from 1992 to 1995, Director of Archer Daniels Midland Company from 1991 to 1995, Director of the Board of Directors of The GSI Group from 1995 to 2001, director of ConAgra Foods from 2002 to 2006, director of Agro Tech Foods Ltd. until October 26, 2006, and director at Sloan Implement. He became a Lindsay Corporation director in 1995, and served as chairman from 2002 to 2003. and in 2008, announced he would let his term as a director expire in January 2010.

He is, as of 1992, a director of Berkshire Hathaway, Inc., and President of Buffett Farms.

Howard G. Buffett has been a Director of The Coca-Cola Company since December 9, 2010. From 1993 to 2004 he was a director of Coca-Cola Enterprises, the world's largest Coca-Cola bottler.

In December 2011, Warren Buffett told CBS News that he would like his son Howard to succeed him as Berkshire Hathaway's non-executive chairman.

On September 18, 2026, Howard was named Berkshire Hathaway's new chairman upon his father's decision to step down.

== Politics ==
Buffett, a Republican, served as a County Commissioner in Douglas County, Nebraska from 1989 to 1992. He also served as the Chairman of the Nebraska Ethanol Authority and Development Board from 1989 to 1991. He is a former member of the Board of the Commission on Presidential Debates.

Buffett was sworn in as Sheriff of Macon County, Illinois, on September 15, 2017. He was selected to fill the remaining term of office after the resignation of former Sheriff Thomas Schneider. Buffett has been an active volunteer with the Macon County Sheriff's Office for several years, having been appointed Undersheriff by Schneider. Buffett, through the Howard G. Buffett Foundation has donated several million dollars to various law enforcement agencies and projects throughout central Illinois. As Sheriff the Howard G. Buffett Foundation continued to donate funds to purchase patrol rifles and radio earpieces for the Macon County Sheriff’s Office along with money to implement a Personal Patrol Vehicle Program.

In January 2019, the Phoenix New Times ran a 27-page investigative report potentially implying that Howard Buffett used money donated to his charitable foundation principally by his father to gain influence and obtain a position in the Cochise County, Arizona Sheriffs Department possibly to conduct operations against migrants in the borderlands or to combat drug-runners. The operations implied by the report include the stockpiling or donation of weapons and a questionable defoliation campaign.

On May 3, 2021, Buffett announced he would run for the Republican nomination to challenge incumbent Democratic sheriff Tony Brown. On June 4, 2021, Judge Anna Benjamin ruled that Republican candidate Jim Root had actually defeated Democratic candidate Tony Brown by sixteen votes in the 2018 election. Brown, who was sworn in as Sheriff in 2018, chose to resign the position rather than appeal the ruling. On June 12, 2021, Buffett suspended his campaign for sheriff citing state legislation changing the requirement to serve as a county sheriff in Illinois.

== Media ==
Buffett has published eight books on conservation, wildlife, and the human condition, and has written articles and opinion pieces for The Wall Street Journal and The Washington Post. In 1996, Harvard published his thesis, The Partnership of Biodiversity and High-Yield Agricultural Production.

During the Russian invasion of Ukraine in 2022 and 2023, Buffett advocated for greater US support to Ukraine in a series of TV appearances.

== Books ==
In 2000, Buffett co-produced a book of photography with Colin Mead, Images of the Wild, an information source for traveling to wildlife areas in North America and Africa.

In 2001, he wrote On the Edge: Balancing Earth's Resources which focused on preserving world biodiversity, species and habitats. Former Senator Paul Simon authored the foreword.

In 2002, Buffett wrote Tapestry of Life, a compilation of portraits taken in Bangladesh, Ethiopia, Ghana, India, and other countries with deep poverty and human need. Tom Brokaw authored the foreword. Also in 2002, he published Taking Care of Our World, a book that teaches children about ecology.

In 2003, he co-wrote Spots Before Your Eyes with Ann van Dyk. The foreword was authored by Dr. Jane Goodall. Spots Before Your Eyes presents history and facts about the cheetah species.

In 2005, he published Threatened Kingdom: The Story of the Mountain Gorilla which provides information about the mountain gorilla's habitat and the challenges facing the species.

In 2009, he wrote Fragile: The Human Condition with the support of National Geographic. The foreword was authored by Shakira Mebarak. Fragile: The Human Condition is the documentation of life stories in sixty-five countries.

In 2013, he co-wrote the New York Times Bestseller Forty Chances: Finding Hope in a Hungry World with his son Howard Warren Buffett. The foreword was authored by Warren Buffett.

In 2018, he wrote Our 50-State Border Crisis: How the Mexican Border Fuels the Drug Epidemic Across America, with a foreword by Heidi Heitkamp and a preface by Cindy McCain.

== Philanthropy ==
Buffett serves or has served on the National Geographic Council of Advisors, World Wildlife Fund National Council, Cougar Fund, Illinois and Nebraska Chapters of the Nature Conservancy, Ecotrust, and the Africa Foundation. Buffett founded the Nature Conservation Trust, a non-profit Trust in South Africa to support cheetah conservation, the International Cheetah Conservation Foundation, and was a Founding Director of The Cougar Fund. In October 2007, Buffett was named a Goodwill Ambassador Against Hunger by the United Nations World Food Programme. He later joined the boards of the Barefoot Foundation and the ONE Campaign. In March 2010, Buffett became a member of the Eastern Congo Initiative founded by Ben Affleck. "I joined Ben in this effort because I believe strongly in investing in sustainable solutions to humanitarian challenges," he said. The following year in 2011, Buffett teamed up with the Bridgeway Foundation to fund a program.

=== The Howard G. Buffett Foundation ===
As the CEO and Chairman of the Howard G. Buffett Foundation (HGBF), Buffett has traveled to over 130 countries to document the challenges of preserving biodiversity and providing adequate resources to support human demands. The HGBF supports projects in the areas of agriculture, nutrition, water, humanitarian, conservation, and conflict/unaccompanied persons. The HGBF focuses much of its funding on communities in Africa and Central America. In 2007, the HGBF launched the Global Water Initiative with several organizations to address the declining fresh water supply and clean water to the world's poorest people.

In March 2014, The HGBF donated USD $23.7 million (RAND 255 million), as part of a joint three-year initiative between HGBF, the Nature Conservation Trust (NCT) and South African National Parks (SANParks), to combat the poaching of Rhino in South Africa. The HGBF has committed $200 million to develop the municipality of Tibú, which has the second largest coca crop in Colombia, and to help local farmers to substitute growing coca with legal crops like cacao. The HGBF was one of five philanthropic groups that received a combined $2.9 billion of Class B shares in Berkshire Hathaway from Warren Buffett in July 2020. In 2020, the Howard G. Buffett Foundation received the FBI Director’s Community Leadership Award.

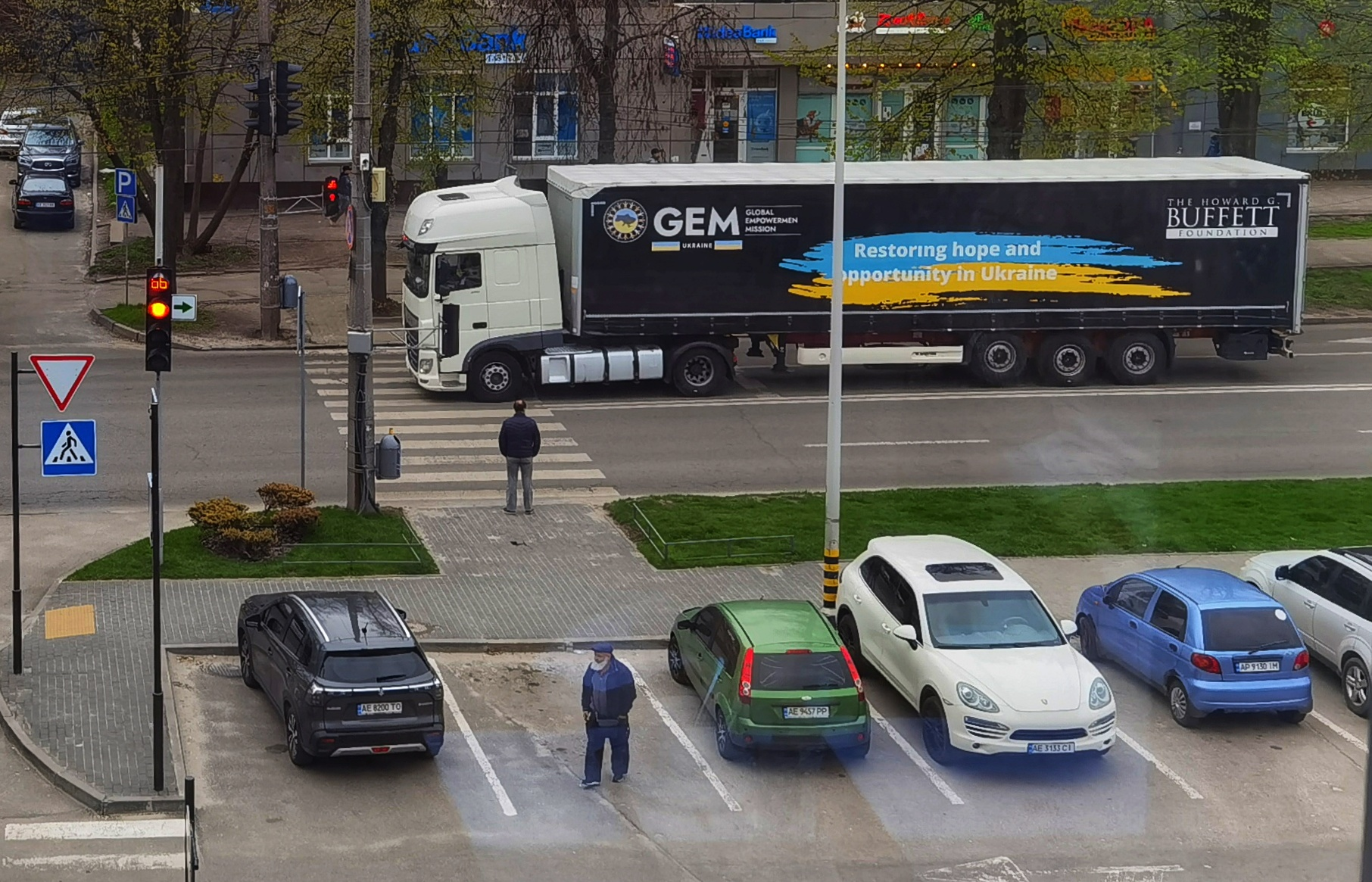
Truck of GEM and The Howard G. Buffett Foundation in Dnipro, Ukraine.

Starting in 2022, during Russia's invasion of Ukraine, the foundation provided aid to Ukraine and coordinated efforts with USAID. One form of aid included donations of seeds to Ukrainian farmers. A $2.3M grant from the foundation to Nova Ukraine funded warming centers at over 20 railway stations in Ukraine during the winter months. These centers provided heated shelter, warm drinks, hygiene products and emergency internet. In 2025, The Howard G. Buffett Foundation funded the restoration of the Kharkiv printing house "Faktor-Druk" after it was destroyed by a Russian missile strike in May 2024. The printing house fully resumed operations thanks to allocated investments that exceeded $8 million.

As of August 2025, the foundation has provided humanitarian aid in excess of USD800 million to Ukraine, including aid with clearing farmland of mines, restoring bombed houses, investigating war crimes, and building and outfitting a hospital. Buffett has also traveled to Ukraine to assist in humanitarian efforts, such as helping the National Police evacuate civilians during the Kupiansk offensive.

== Awards ==
Ribbon bar	Country	Honour	Year
	Mexico	Order of the Aztec Eagle	2000
	Rwanda	Igihango Medal	2017
	Ukraine	Order of Prince Yaroslav the Wise, 5th Class	2022
	Ukraine	National Legend of Ukraine	2024

Buffett has received the Order of the Aztec Eagle Award, the highest honor bestowed on a foreign citizen by the Mexican Government, an honorary PhD from Lincoln College and Honorary Doctorate of Human Letters from Penn State University. and has been recognized by the Inter-American Institute for Co-operation in Agriculture as one of the most distinguished individuals in agriculture. He has also won the Will Owen Jones Distinguished Journalist of the Year Award, World Ecology Award, George McGovern Leadership Award, National Farmers Union Meritorious Service to Humanity Award, Columbia University Global Leadership Award, Leader in Agriculture Award from Agriculture Future of America, and Special Service Award from the Association for International Agriculture and Rural Development, and the International Quality of Life Award. Buffett was among the nine people who were awarded the Igihango medal by Rwandan President Paul Kagame in 2017. Buffett was awarded the Order of Prince Yaroslav the Wise, 5th class. (Ukraine, August 23, 2022) — for significant personal merits in strengthening interstate cooperation, support of state sovereignty and territorial integrity of Ukraine, significant contribution to the popularization of the Ukrainian state in the world. Buffett was among 11 people who were awarded the National Legend of Ukraine Award by the President of Ukraine in 2024. From the Peterson Literary Fund-2025, Howard Graham Buffett was awarded the "Journey to the Truth" award in 2025 for his contribution to spreading the truth about the war in Ukraine. Ego was noted for: documenting three years of the war in the book "Courage of the Nation", supplemented by photographs taken during 23 trips to Ukraine; the role of the executive producer of the award-winning film "Porcelain War", which raised awareness of the brutality of Russian aggression; provision of humanitarian aid to Ukraine in the amount exceeding 1 billion dollars.

== See also ==
- Warren Buffett (father)
- Susan Buffett (mother)
- Peter Buffett (brother)
- Susan Alice Buffett (sister)
- Astrid Menks Buffett (stepmother)
- Howard Warren Buffett (son)
