= Kim Robertson =

Kim Robertson is the name of

- Kim Robertson (athlete) (born 1957), New Zealand sprinter
- Kim Robertson (musician), American harpist
