= Bragg Hill Family Life Center =

The Family Life Center
- Formation: 1997
- Type: Faith-based
- Legal status: Non-profit organization
- Purpose: "To provide assistance to the Fredericksburg area’s at-risk youth and economically deprived citizens with special emphasis on total growth and development of the community."
- Location: Fredericksburg, Virginia

Bragg Hill Family Life Center (BHFLC) is a local nonprofit organization based in Fredericksburg, Virginia. Its mission is "to provide assistance to the area’s at-risk youth and economically deprived citizens with special emphasis on total growth and development of the community.” The organization is a tax exempt, faith-based community center that provides programs and services to underprivileged youth, families, and individuals in Fredericksburg and its surrounding counties.

== History ==
Bragg Hill Family Life Center was established in September 1997 by Joseph D. Henderson, Sr. and Doris S. Henderson, former residents of Bragg Hill, one of the area's low income neighborhoods. Their goal to become a “Permanent Positive Presence” in the community began as an outreach ministry of their church, Tower of Deliverance.

Originally located in a small storefront, BHFLC expanded in August 2003 by purchasing a former juvenile detention center. In 2006 BHFLC expanded again with the addition of a new 20,000 square foot gymnasium and fitness facility, the Sunshine Fitness and Wellness Center.

== Programs and Services ==
BHFLC offers homework help, fitness and wellness programs, job readiness assistance, emergency food and clothing, computer access and training, senior craft classes, a prayer group, and other ministries. The center hosts annual holiday and educational events including community dinners, Santa Day, Lights On Afterschool, and festivities for Martin Luther King, Jr. Day.

Bragg Hill Family Life Center emphasizes youth programs. It provides weekday afterschool activities, fitness and craft activities, and a summer camp to provide children with the opportunity to participate in sports, art, and other supervised activities. Within the year, BHFLC plans to launch Star Youth Academy, a licensed preschool geared towards children in the surrounding communities.

BHFLC also functions as a community hub. It encourages other organizations to use its facilities to host events and meetings, ranging from faith-based retreats to public school Math & Science Nights to weekly parental support groups administered by RACCAP.

=== Sunshine Fitness and Wellness Center ===
In 2006 BHFLC expanded by adding a $2 million 20,000 square foot gymnasium and fitness facility, the Sunshine Fitness and Wellness Center. The facility was constructed based on donations from local philanthropist, Doris Buffet's Sunshine Lady Foundation in conjunction with area churches, businesses, and community organizations.

== Impact ==
In the course of its existence, Bragg Hill Family Life Center has developed into a multipurpose community center, and it has served thousands of people in the community. In a 2008 editorial, The Free Lance-Star commends, “The story of Bragg Hill Family Life Center is not just about buildings and programs, it’s about changed lives. It’s about casting a positive vision, and sowing hope where there is none. It’s about believing that giving people a hand up can make a difference, that strengthening families should be a community goal, and that health and wellness are not impossible dreams. Most of all, it’s about building bonds in a community in an age when that kind of closeness is clearly endangered.”

While expressing his desire to reform the United States’ criminal justice system, U.S. Sen. Jim Webb (VA-D) praised BHFLC for its focus on aiding families and its work in helping incarcerated individuals transition back into regular life. Following a visit to the center in 2009, Webb said, “This is a great role model for how we can be addressing these issues nationwide.”
