= USS Roark =

US Navy frigate

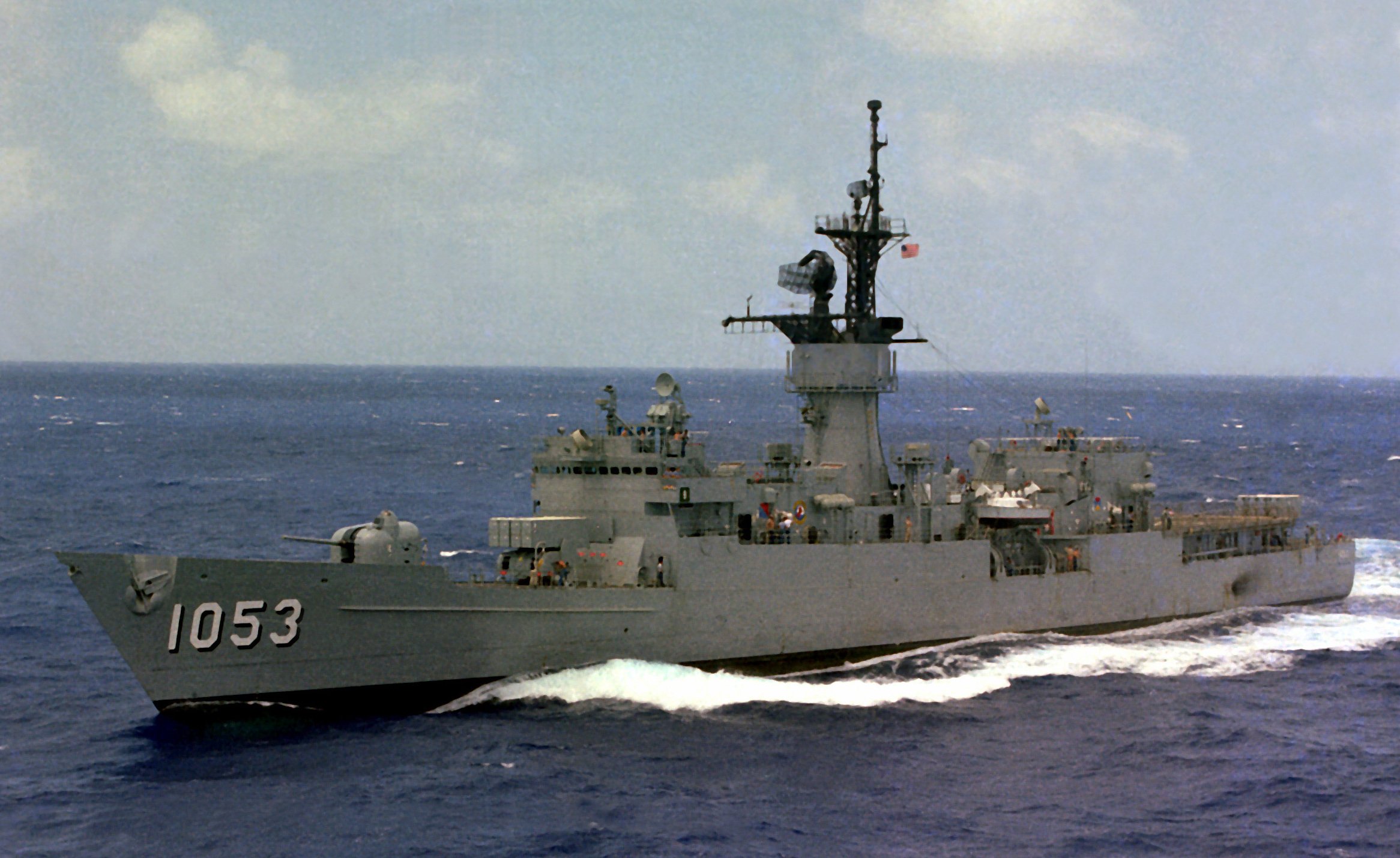
- USS Roark (FF-1053) off Hawaii in 1981

History

United States
- Name: USS Roark
- Namesake: William Marshall Roark
- Ordered: 22 July 1964
- Builder: Todd Pacific Shipyards, Seattle, Washington
- Laid down: 2 February 1966
- Launched: 27 April 1967
- Sponsored by: Mrs. William M. Roark; Mrs. Frank F. Roark
- Acquired: 14 November 1969
- Commissioned: 22 November 1969
- Decommissioned: 14 December 1991
- Reclassified: As FF, 30 June 1975
- Stricken: 11 January 1995
- Home port: San Diego, California
- Motto: Victory thru Service
- Fate: Scrapped, 2004

General characteristics
- Class & type: Knox-class frigate
- Displacement: 3,011 tons (4,100 full load)
- Length: 415 ft (126 m) waterline; 438 ft (134 m) overall
- Beam: 47 ft (14 m)
- Draft: 24.75 ft (7.54 m)
- Propulsion: 2 × CE 1200psi boilers; 1 Westinghouse geared turbine; 1 shaft, 35,000 shp (26,000 kW)
- Speed: 27 knots (50 km/h; 31 mph)
- Range: 4,500 nmi (8,300 km; 5,200 mi)
- Complement: 15 officers, 230 men
- Sensors & processing systems: AN/SPS-10 surface search; AN/SPS-40 air search; AN/SQS-26CX sonar
- Electronic warfare & decoys: AN/SLQ-32 Electronics Warfare System
- Armament: 1 × 5 in (130 mm)/54gun; 4 × 21″ torpedo tubes (4×1, fixed); 1 × 8-tube ASROC + Harpoon launcher; 1 × 8-cell BPDMS Sea Sparrow launcher
- Aircraft carried: 1 SH-2 Seasprite (LAMPS I) helicopter

USS Roark (FF-1053), originally designated DE-1053, was a Knox-class frigate named for William Marshall Roark, Distinguished Flying Cross recipient and first American killed in the Vietnam War to have a ship named for them. Roark was laid down on 2 February 1966 by the Todd Shipyards Corporation in Seattle, Washington; launched on 24 April 1967, sponsored by Mrs. William M. Roark, widow and Mrs. Frank F. Roark, mother of namesake; and commissioned on 22 November 1969.

== Namesake ==
William Marshall Roark was born 23 October 1938 in Sioux City, Iowa to Frank F. Roark (1906 – 1994) and Madge E. Roark (1909 – 1997). He grew up in Omaha, Nebraska and attended Omaha Central High School. He was appointed to the United States Naval Academy in 1956, he graduated and was commissioned ensign on 8 June 1960 and advanced to the rank of lieutenant, 1 June 1964.

He attended the naval flight school at Pensacola, Florida, and Corpus Christi, Texas, and subsequently reported for duty with Attack Squadron 153 on board USS Coral Sea. He was killed in action 7 April 1965 while flying an A-4 Skyhawk on a bombing mission over North Vietnam. He was posthumously awarded the Distinguished Flying Cross.

He was survived by his parents, his wife Karen and three children, Lisa, John and William. His remains were recovered in March 1977.

== History ==
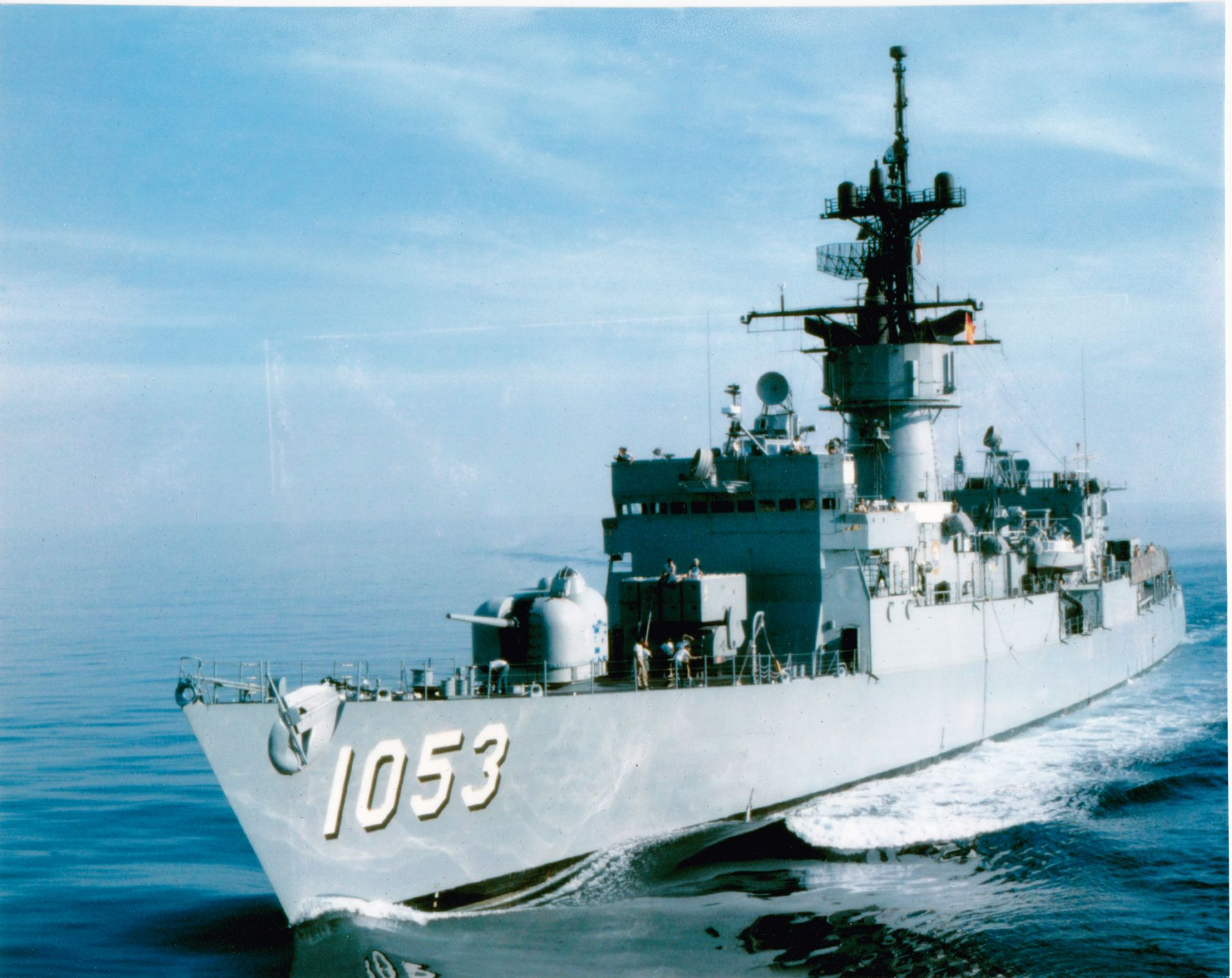
Roark in the South Pacific during "SouthPac 79", February 1979.

Since completing shakedown in the spring of 1970, Roark a unit of DESRON 21, conducted training operations out of her homeport of San Diego, California, until the end of the year. With 1971 she began preparations for her first deployment with the 7th Fleet in the Western Pacific and departed from San Diego 7 January. After stopping at Pearl Harbor and refueling at Midway Island, Roark suffered a fire in her engine room. The damage was sufficient to require her return to Pearl Harbor for repairs. Almost two months later, in March, she was underway again for WestPac. She remained in the western Pacific until July, when she started for home, arriving in San Diego, California, on 10 August. For the remainder of 1971, Roark operated out of San Diego.

The new year, 1972, brought with it another deployment to the Far East. She departed San Diego on 8 February and arrived in Subic Bay, Philippines, on 29 February. She operated in the Western Pacific, primarily in the Vietnam area until 15 August, when she pointed her bow homeward. Roark entered San Diego 30 August and remained in the vicinity for the duration of 1972 and the first eight months of 1973. She departed San Diego in August and arrived in Subic Bay on 31 August. After almost four months of deployment with the 7th Fleet, Roark sailed into San Diego on 21 December 1973.

Between 1973 and 1987 the USS Roark served as an active escort frigate with the US Pacific fleet, taking part in regular western Pacific deployments, multinational naval exercise and routine operations supporting the Seventh fleet. During 1974-1975 the USS Roark continued its Pacific operations and it was redesignated from DE-1053 to FF-1053.

As of summer 1984 USS Roark was assigned to Destroyer Squadron Nine, commanded by CAPT Thomas O. Gabriel. At that time DESRON NINE consisted of flagship Paul F. Foster (DD-964) and USS George Philip (FFG-12) stationed in Long Beach and USS Robison (DDG-12) and USS Roark homeported at 32nd St. Naval Station San Diego. USS Roark deployed with them in August 84 for Westpac, returning in March 1985. DESRON NINE had an integrated chaplain, LT Harold W. Staats, and had just been assigned its first medical officer in many years, LT David A Davis M.D. USS Roark was provided sick call, food service inspection, industrial hygiene, occupational health, and divine services throughout the deployment by multiple helicopter cable transfers.

Roark transferred to the Naval Reserve in 1987 and was decommissioned 14 December 1991. She was disposed of by scrapping, dismantling beginning on 13 October 2004.

== Honors and awards ==
Roark received three campaign stars for Vietnam War service.

== Awards, citations and campaign ribbons ==
According to NavSource:

- Combat Action Ribbon
- Navy "E" Ribbon (6)
- Navy Expeditionary Medal
- National Defense Service Medal (with one star)
- Vietnam Service Medal (with three stars)
- Humanitarian Service Ribbon
- Sea Service Deployment Ribbon
- Vietnam Campaign Medal
