= Buffett's Candies =

Candy company in Albuquerque, New Mexico

- Industry: Candy shop
- Founded: 1956
- Founder: George Buffett
- Headquarters: 7001 Lomas NE and 5410 Academy Road NE
- Owner: Donna and Tyler Buffett
- Website: Official website

Buffett's Candies is a candy business located in Albuquerque, New Mexico. It was established in 1956.

== History ==
George D. Buffett, a former state representative and cousin of Warren Buffett, opened Buffett's Candies in 1956. He ran the store every day until he died in 2012; in his lifetime, his youngest daughter, Patty, ran the store with him for about 20 years, finally divesting in 2018. His sons, George Duval Buffett II (1964-2022) and John Buffett, ran the concessions part of the business until George's death. Donna, John, and Patty Buffett have run the enterprise since along with Tyler. In 2024, Buffett's opened a second location, a 20,000 sq. ft. facility with a "20-foot immersive walk-in with floor-to-ceiling glass" so visitors could experience the factory atmosphere.

== Menu ==
Buffett's offers confections such as chocolates, creams, truffles, brittles, fudge, cherry cordials, candied popcorn, and lollipops.

Signature items include regional specialties such as piñon candy made with locally harvested piñon nuts, green chile caramel popcorn, and the distinctive "Pecañero Brittle." Otherproducts include caramel corn, pecan "horny toads" (chocolate-pecan caramels), soft divinity, and various nut brittles. The shop also produces seasonal specialties like chocolate-covered strawberries, salt water taffy, and themed novelties for holidays throughout the year.
