= Iowa Board of Regents =

Governing body for public universities in Iowa, United States

The three public universities in Iowa

The Iowa Board of Regents is the 9-member governing body overseeing the three public universities in the state of Iowa: the University of Iowa, Iowa State University, and the University of Northern Iowa; and, the Iowa School for the Deaf, and the Iowa Braille and Sight Saving School.

== Composition ==
The governor of Iowa appoints regents to six-year terms, which are subject to Iowa Senate confirmation by a two-thirds vote. Terms begin May 1 and end April 30.

The board has nine members. Under state law, one of the regents must be a student of one of the three public universities, and no more than five members can be of the same political affiliation or gender.

The current members of the Board of Regents are as follows:

Name	Current city	Occupation	Term ends	Gender	Political affiliation
Robert Cramer (board president)	Adel	Construction business owner	2029	Male	Republican
Kurt Tjaden (president pro tem)	Bettendorf	Retired corporate president	2031	Male	Independent
Peter Cownie	West Des Moines	Former state legislator	2031	Male	Republican
Nancy Dunkel	Dyersville	Retired banker and former Iowa House member	2029	Female	Democrat
Lucy Gipple	New Sharon	University of Northern Iowa student	2027	Female	Independent
Christine Hensley	Des Moines	Retired; Former Des Moines City Council member	2027	Female	Republican
Steve Lacy	Des Moines	Former CEO of Meredith Corporation	2029	Male	Democrat
Greta Rouse	Emmetsburg	Comms Director (for Branstad, then Reynolds)	2027	Female	Republican
Vacant					
