= George D. Buffett =

American politician (1928–2012)

Member of the New Mexico House of Representatives for the 24th district
- In office 1979–2002

Personal details
- Born: November 19, 1928 Casper, Wyoming, U.S.
- Died: October 13, 2012 (aged 83) Albuquerque, New Mexico, U.S.
- Party: Republican
- Spouse: Jeanette Franzen
- Relations: Warren Buffett
- Education: University of New Mexico
- Profession: Businessman

George Duval Buffett (November 19, 1928 – October 13, 2012) was an American politician who was a Republican member of the New Mexico House of Representatives from 1979 to 2002. Buffett attended University of New Mexico and was a businessman. He died in 2012. He was an arch-conservative state representative, owner of Buffett's Candies and cousin of Warren Buffett.

George's interest in politics stemmed from his uncle, congressman Howard Homan Buffett. He attended the 1952 Republican National Convention in Chicago. He served as a State Representative for 24 years (1979-2002). He was a fiscal conservative. He started writing a political newsletter, called Buffett's Bullets, to educate and to provide insight into the inner workings of politics in NM from 1989 through 2008 and had a mailing list that grew from 150 to over 10,000 people from across the state. He also served as the Republican National Committeeman for the State of NM for four years (2004-2008) and he again attended the Republican National Convention 2008 in Minneapolis.

George founded B&H Company in 1952, which ran concessions at various fiestas and fairs across the state. This business also ran the concessions at the ABQ Zoo for 16 years, the concessions at Speedway Park, the concessions at the Civic Auditorium and the concessions at the ABQ Dukes for 18 years. This business grew into B&H Wholesale, which supplies other concessionaires, their products and currently distributes across the state of NM and into parts of AZ, CO, OK, TX and UT. In 1956, George founded Buffett's Candies. George founded also the Popcorn Cannery, which produces and distributes pre-popped and flavored popcorn to grocery stores in ABQ. Legislative financial disclosure forms have listed George's ownership of unspecified shares in Warren Buffett's Berkshire Hathaway.
