= J. Schuyler Long =

American educator, author and principal (1869–1933)

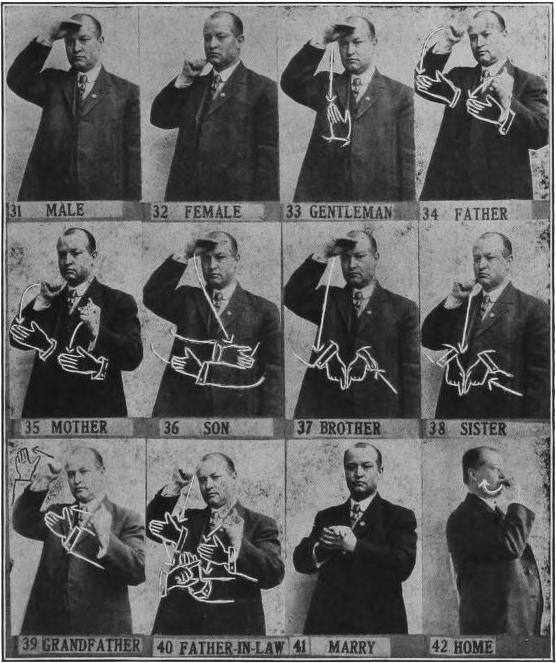
- Born: Joseph Schuyler Long; 1869; Marshalltown, Iowa, U.S.
- Died: October 31, 1933 (aged 64)
- Education: Gallaudet University

Joseph Schuyler Long (1869 – October 31, 1933) was an American educator, author, and principal. He taught deaf children and authored the first standard picture dictionary of American Sign Language after becoming deaf himself as a child. He also wrote a book of poetry titled Out of the Silence.

== Biography ==
Joseph Schuyler Long was born in 1869 to William and Lucy Perry Long in Marshalltown, Iowa. In 1881 Long became deaf from cerebrospinal meningitis. He entered the Iowa School for the Deaf and graduated in 1884 and entered Gallaudet College in Washington, D.C.

In 1889 he became a teacher of the deaf and an athletic director at the Wisconsin School for the Deaf. He received his degree from Gallaudet College in 1895. In 1901 he was a head teacher at the Iowa School for the Deaf and an editor of the school periodical, The Iowa Hawkeye (the mascot later changed to the bobcat). In 1902 he was made acting principal and in 1908 full principal.

He published the dictionary The Sign Language. A Manual of Signs in 1909. The Schuyler Long Collection at Gallaudet College includes the original 32 photograph plates used in the first edition of his sign language dictionary; it was the first standard picture dictionary of sign language and has been referred to as "The Deaf man's equivalent of Webster's Dictionary".

In 1914 Long received a Doctor of Letters Degree from Gallaudet College. In 1928 he began work on an anthology of poems by deaf authors. On October 31, 1933, he died from heart failure at the age of 64 "at his home at the Iowa School for the Deaf, Council Bluffs... [and] [b]urial was in Riverside Cemetery, Marshalltown."

== Legacy ==
In 1960 The Silent Muse Anthology, of his collected works was published.

Long's daughter, Dorothy Long, married Professor William Hertzog Thompson, and through Dorothy's daughter, Susan Thompson Buffett, Long was the grandfather-in-law of billionaire investor, Warren Buffett.

== Bibliography ==
- The Sign Language: A Manual of Signs. Washington, D.C.: Press of Gibson Bros. 1910. OCLC 3648943.
- Iowa School for the Deaf at Council Bluffs: Its history, growth and development. 1910.
- Out of the Silence. A Book of Verse. Council Bluffs. 1909. OCLC 4300353.
- The Silent Muse: An Anthology of Prose and Poetry by the Deaf. 1960. OCLC 4606693.
