= William Hertzog Thompson =

American psychology professor and minister (1895–1981)

William H. Thompson
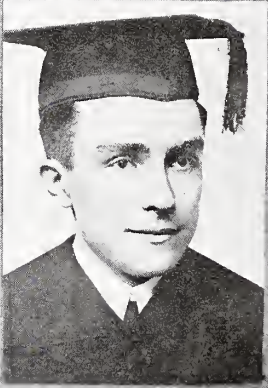
- William H. Thompson in 1917
- Born: William Hertzog Thompson; June 16, 1895; Greeley, Colorado, U.S.
- Died: July 6, 1981 (aged 86); Omaha, Nebraska, U.S.
- Occupations: Writer; psychologist; professor; Presbyterian minister
- Spouse: Dorothy Long (m. 1923)
- Children: 2, including Susan

William Hertzog Thompson (June 16, 1895 – July 6, 1981) was an American writer, psychologist and Presbyterian minister. He was the father of Susan Buffett and the father-in-law of Warren Buffett.

== Early life and education ==
William Hertzog Thompson was born June 16, 1895, in Greeley, Colorado, to Lorin Andrew Thompson, a newspaper editor and postal inspector, and Annie Hertzog Thompson, a mother of four sons and active church member. In 1903 the family moved to Omaha, Nebraska, where Thompson eventually graduated from the University of Omaha (later part of the University of Nebraska) in 1917 and he received his master's from the University of Nebraska in 1925 in educational psychology.

== Career ==
Thompson worked as a Presbyterian minister and a high school teacher and coach at various schools in Iowa and Nebraska. In 1922 Thompson married Dorothy Long who was a teacher at the Iowa School for the Deaf where her father, J. Schuyler Long, was the long time principal and published the first sign-language dictionary. In 1930 Thompson received a Ph.D. in psychology from Ohio State University, where his uncle, William Oxley Thompson had been president, and then Thompson went on to teach and serve as a dean at the University of Nebraska and University of Omaha until he retired in 1960.

== Personal life ==
Thompson's second daughter, Susan Buffett, married Warren Buffett in 1952.

William Thompson was one of the earliest investors in Buffett's partnerships. Thompson died in 1981, at age 86, and Thompson's daughter, Susan Buffett and her family donated the "William H. Thompson Scholars Learning Community" at the University of Nebraska Omaha in his honor.

== Works ==
- "An Experiment with the Dalton Plan" (1933)
- "An Analysis of Errors in Written Composition By Deaf Children" (1936)
- The Fool Has Said God is Dead (1966)
- Songs of Nebraska (1977)
