= Ernest P. Buffett =

American businessman (1877–1946)

- Born: Ernest Platt Buffett; February 3, 1877; Dix Hills, New York, U.S.
- Died: September 22, 1946 (aged 69); Omaha, Nebraska, U.S.
- Resting place: Forest Lawn Memorial Park
- Occupation: Businessman
- Political party: Republican
- Children: 5, including Howard Buffett

Ernest Platt Buffett (February 3, 1877 – September 22, 1946) was an American businessman and grocer. He was the father of U.S. Congressman Howard Buffett and grandfather of businessman and investor Warren Buffett.

== Early life ==
Buffett was born in Dix Hills, New York, on February 3, 1877, to Sidney Homan Buffett (1848–1927) and Eveline Ketcham Buffett (1850–1886). Buffett's parents were second cousins, both having mainly English descent. The Buffet surname (changed to Buffett) originates in France with a Huguenot weaver, named John Buffett, who became Buffett's first American Buffett ancestor when he immigrated to New York in the late 1600s.

Buffett attended Omaha High School.

== Career ==
After graduation from high school, he worked at his father's "Buffett & Son" grocery from 1895 to 1915, becoming the owner and operator of its new downtown branch location in 1915. He employed his grandson Warren at the grocery store when he was in high school.

Buffett gained local and national recognition for his innovation in the grocery industry for the first decades of the 20th century. He founded a retail cooperative organization known as "Buy-Rite" which allowed smaller, family-owned grocers to compete with the larger chain supermarkets and stores through cooperative purchasing and advertising.

In 1902, Buffett became the president of the Omaha Retail Grocers Association and later was the president of the Nebraska Retail Grocers Association. He also was an active member of the National Retail Grocers Association. Buffett was a member of the local chamber of commerce, rotary club, Boy Scouts of America council, and served for a period as president of the Nebraska Humane Society.

Buffett was an astute businessman who was known to be frugal, strict, and conservative. In 1939, he wrote, "there has never been a Buffett who ever left a very large estate, but there has never been one that did not leave something. They never spent all they made, but always saved part of what they made, and it has all worked out pretty well."

== Personal life ==
Buffett married Henrietta Duvall on March 21, 1898. They had 5 children, including Howard Buffett, a four-term member of the United States House of Representatives (1903–1964). Buffett is the grandfather of famed American businessman and investor Warren Buffett. After Henrietta's death in 1921, Buffett married Belle Bailey in 1922.

The Buffetts were active members of Dundee Presbyterian Church in Omaha.

Buffett was writing an unfinished book titled, “How to Run a Grocery Store and a Few Things I Have Learned About Fishing.”

== Death ==
Buffett died on September 22, 1946, at the age of 69 in Omaha. He is buried at Prospect Hill Cemetery.
