= Susan Buffett =

American activist (1932–2004)

- Buffett during an interview with Charlie Rose
- Born: Susan Thompson; June 15, 1932; Omaha, Nebraska, U.S.
- Died: July 29, 2004 (aged 72); Cody, Wyoming, U.S.
- Education: Northwestern University
- Occupations: Singer; businessperson; activist; philanthropist
- Spouse: Warren Buffett (m. 1952)
- Children: Susan Alice; Howard Graham; Peter Andrew
- Father: William Hertzog Thompson
- Relatives: Howard Warren Buffett (grandson)

Susan Thompson Buffett (June 15, 1932 – July 29, 2004) was an American activist for the causes of civil rights, abortion rights and birth control, and the first wife of investor Warren Buffett. She was a director of Berkshire Hathaway, owning 2.2 percent of the company worth about $3 billion at the time of her death, making her the 153rd richest person in the world. Buffett was also president of the Buffett Foundation, which has contributed millions of dollars to educational groups, medical research, family planning groups and other charities.

== Biography ==
Susan was born in Omaha, Nebraska, and graduated from Omaha Central High School. Her father, William Hertzog Thompson, was a minister, psychologist, dean at the University of Nebraska-Omaha, and one-time campaign manager for Howard Buffett.

Though her parents and Warren's knew one another, they met at Northwestern University, via Susan's roommate Roberta Buffett, Warren's sister.

Susan and Warren married in 1952 at the Dundee Presbyterian Church in Omaha. They had three children together: Susan (born July 30, 1953), Howard (born December 16, 1954), and Peter (born May 4, 1958).

Allegations have been made regarding Susan's conduct during her marriage to Warren. These include claims that in the mistaken belief her husband had cheated on her with his friend, Katharine Graham, she sent Graham a passive-aggressive letter that "let her date Warren Buffett", and that she had a relationship with her tennis coach, John McCabe.

She occasionally performed hit classics from the early 1970s cabaret singer and, in 1977, had a one-night performance at an Omaha theater. Encouraged by songwriter/musician Neil Sedaka to pursue a singing career, she left her husband and moved to a small apartment in San Francisco with her paramour, John McCabe, in Gramercy Tower on Nob Hill. Later, she moved into a large condominium on Broadway near Scott Street in Pacific Heights with views of the Golden Gate Bridge and Alcatraz. She remained married and on good terms with her husband, vacationing together with him and spending time assisting charitable groups. She performed in New York and released several CDs. According to Roger Lowenstein's 1995 Random House biography, Buffett: The Making of an American Capitalist, while Warren had encouraged Susan to pursue her career in music, he was heartbroken by her move.

In 1978, Susan introduced her husband to Astrid Menks, who moved in with Warren in their Omaha home, and married him after Susan's death.

The Buffetts attended public functions as husband and wife though they had not lived together for more than half of their marriage. The Buffetts even signed Christmas cards, Warren, Susan, and Astrid, and were often seen together as a trio.

== Later life ==
In October 2003, Susan was diagnosed with oral cancer; she underwent surgery, radiation therapy and facial reconstruction. Warren flew out from Omaha to be with her every weekend during her recovery and the couple would later contribute $6 million to five California doctors for the study of oral cancer. She had recovered enough to attend the annual shareholders' meeting of Berkshire Hathaway in May 2004, leading a singalong at the Borsheim's reception.

Susan died at the age of 72 after suffering a cerebral hemorrhage during the summer of 2004 in Cody, Wyoming. Bono performed "Forever Young" and "All I Want Is You" at her funeral. Warren was so grief-stricken that he did not attend. She left approximately $50 million to her children's charity while each of her children received $10 million and each grandchild received $100,000. She also left a number of friends and employees substantial sums, including $8 million to John McCabe and $1 million to Ron Parks. Nearly all of her Berkshire Hathaway shares, valued at nearly $3 billion at the time, were left to a foundation that would later bear her name.
