= Buffet (surname) =

Buffet is a surname of French origin. Notable people with the surname include:

- The Buffet family of musical instrument makers
- Bernard Buffet (1928–1999), a French painter
- Jimmy Buffett (1946–2023), an American singer-songwriter
- Louis Buffet (1818–1898), a 19th-century French statesman
- Marie-George Buffet (born 1949), a French politician
- Robin Buffet (born 1991), a French alpine skier
- Yannick Buffet (born 1979), a French ski mountaineer

== See also ==
- Buffett
