= Smorgasbord (disambiguation) =

A smörgåsbord is a type of Scandinavian meal, originating in Sweden, served buffet-style with multiple hot and cold dishes of various foods on a table.

Smorgasbord may also refer to:

- Smorgasbord (album), a 1979 album by Sharon, Lois & Bram
- Smorgasbord, the original title of the 1983 Jerry Lewis film Cracking Up
- Smorgasbord, a Donald Duck comics character

== See also ==
- Buffet
- Smorgasburg, a weekly food festival in Williamsburg, Brooklyn
