= The Buffet (play) =

The Buffet (Arabic: البوفيه Il-Bufayh) is a 1968 one-act play by Ali Salem which is widely regarded as a classic of modern Egyptian theatre. The Buffet was written in 1967, first performed at the Hakim Theatre in Cairo in March 1968, published in Arabic in 1969, and in English translation in 1973 by John Waterbury. The term al-Būfīh in Arabic refers to an office canteen or snack bar, although the play is set not down in the canteen, but upstairs in the office of the theatre manager. The cast requires only three actors: a theatre manager in an unnamed Kafkaesque authoritarian state, a playwright trying to get his play produced, and the waiter who brings food up from the buffet below. These characters symbolise the human contract between the powerful (the manager) and the powerless (the playwright) and the waiter (brute force).

The Buffet, which, like all of Ali Salem’s plays was written in colloquial Egyptian ( which is the Egyptians’ everyday spoken language written in Arabic letters but its vocabulary, structure and grammar are so different from the classical written Arabic, which is the script of books and official documents). Also one must bear in mind the symbolic hints in the play since it was written and produced during the late Lt Colonel Gamal Abdel Nasser’s (15 January 1918 – 28 September 1970) autocratic presidency (1956-1970); most writers the time used symbolic and ambiguous references to bypass the censor. The Buffet was also staged in English in Britain scores of times between 1976 and 1981. It was translated and adapted for British theatre by journalist and author Adel Darwish, who produced and directed it in more than one version. The original plot : A playwright taking his play to the (state funded) National theatre, the director of which appears to be soft spoken civilised listening to classical music, and after a long lecture about Anton Chekhov’s influence on Constantin Stanislavski, insists that the writer removes one offensive phrase “ you son of a hound,” and gets more nasty when the author refuses, and then after he was beaten up off stage, the director asks for more changes. The closest to the Egyptian original in Darwish’s various adaptations was first staged under the same title (the Buffet) in 1976 at LAMDA Theatre (London Academy of Music and Dramatic Art) off Earl’s Court road, London, for a short season (a week). Darwish emphasised the Orwellian dimensions in the play, (which were more subtle in Salem’s original version), with references and hints to the off-stage Buffett being in fact Room 101 in Orwell’s Nineteen Eighty-Four. Darwish's London production also underscored the rewriting of history by the director changing the events and relationship of the past ie between Chekhov and Stanislavski to fit the present, namely the way he believes theatre should be presented. The playwright then goes further than what was required, by changing the future (of how his play would be presented) since he controls the present, as dictated by the director. Darwish also changed the offensive phrase from “ you son of a hound”, into “ you cunt.” A year later, Darwish and the young welsh actor Phil Williams (Graduated from New College of Speech and Drama in 1977) adapted it for British viewers. It was staged under the title “Caramba,” and was performed around several London theatres, and regional theatres throughout 1977-1978. The Buffett (Caramba) was performed many times, either as one act lunchtime theatre- which was plays of about under one hour with lunch served to audience ( in venues like The King’s Head, Upper Street Islington and Basement Theatre in Soho, and other venues including some secondary schools); or as a part of a double bill with another play by the same playwright Ali Salem called “ The Wheat Well,” set in the Egyptian Desert ( see summary below) . The Buffet’s third adaptation (still called Caramba) was further developed and directed by Darwish in 1979 and performed as one act play in a double bill at The Young Vic in London, and Edinburgh festival in 1980. The Young Vic season (January 1980) changed the Egyptian original set into a more expressionistic by Darwish’; it was designed to make the playwright appear small and overwhelmed by the experience. It had giant props, like desk telephone the size of wardrobe, pencil holder and pens six feet high, while the stage itself turned into a massive desk. The playwright character in Darwish’s third version (1979-1980) became a miner’s son speaking in Yorkshire accent who arrives at the capital for the first time when summoned by the national theatre director to discuss his first play. And instead of the sadistic waiter, Darwish introduced the director’s assistant as fem-Dom dominatrix (dominant female) in leatherwear and fishnet tights holding a whip and making sadistic sexual gestures. Also, the young Yorkshire writer goes further than what the national theatre director wanted to change, and instead of the subject dealing with the miners and their strike, the writer makes it a musical about a Mexican bordello. The second play in the 1979-1980 season was also by Ali Salem “ The Scribe and The Beggar.” (see summary below)

Of some nine plays translated, adapted and produced by Darwish from Egyptian theatre that were staged in UK, 'The Buffet' stands out as the best received, in its different adaptations by Adel Darwish.

“The Wheat Well,” by Ali Salem was adapted into an English version and directed by Adel Darwish. The play was a satire about how bureaucracy destroys what was planned to improve the lot of the people. The plot: a waiter working at the café of the Egyptian Museum in Cairo deciphers ancient papyrus indicating that the grains stored by Joseph during Egypt's years of plenty, according the biblical story, only one of the seven giant silos was consumed by the Egyptians during the seven years of Famine. The waiter, with the help of a nephew and an adopted apprentice (in the Egyptian version) finds the location of the wheat. Cairo bureaucracy creates an oversized office, with no plans or budget for production of wheat. Darwish’s adaptation presents the apprentice as a hardworking down to earth honest working-class lad while the nephew was a slimy social climber who had other plans. Darwish also introduced three other characters, one represents bureaucracy, and two females; the waiter’s daughter who was seduced and gets pregnant by the slimy second cousin, who was two-timing her with the second female, a daughter of a millionaire. The latter, working for her father, arrives at the grains site by helicopter representing a multinational corporation. And, thanks to corruption in the government, the multinational takes over the project after bribing officials.

“The Scribe and the Beggar,” by Ali Salem” was translated and directed by Darwish as : “Blot” . Darwish kept the location a crossroad in Cairo, and the references to events suggest the era to be mid 1970s. The plot: A Rolls Royce driven by the editor ( dressed in a black tie going to a dinner party) of the state official national daily breaks down, a beggar offers to assist him, but he dismantles the engine placing the parts on the pavement. With each part taken out of the Rolls Royce, the beggar takes out of his sack an object, each symbolises an event, or stage of social life in Egypt under the repressive republic that was established by the 1952 military coup that caused the economy decline to a pre 1900 figures within two decades.
