= Eugene D. O'Sullivan =

American politician

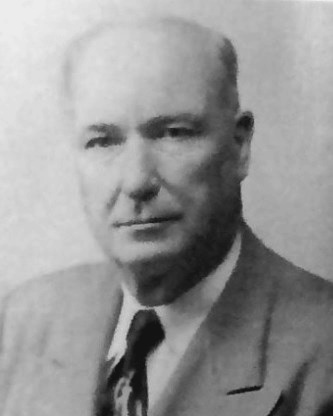
- From 1949's Pictorial Directory of the Eighty-First Congress

Member of the U.S. House of Representatives from Nebraska's 2nd district
- In office January 3, 1949 – January 3, 1951
- Preceded by: Howard Buffett
- Succeeded by: Howard Buffett

Personal details
- Born: May 31, 1883 Kent, Kansas, U.S.
- Died: February 7, 1968 (aged 84) Omaha, Nebraska, U.S.
- Party: Democratic

Eugene Daniel O'Sullivan (May 31, 1883 – February 7, 1968) was an American Democratic Party politician from Nebraska.

He was born in on a cattle ranch near Kent, Kansas to John E. O'Sullivan and Josephine Kluh O'Sullivan on May 31, 1883. He was married to Ellen Katherine Lovely. He graduated from Christian Brothers College, in St. Joseph, Missouri, attended St. Benedict's College, in Atchison, Kansas in 1904 and 1905 and graduated from Creighton University School of Law in Omaha, Nebraska in 1910. He was admitted to the bar in 1910 and set up practice in Omaha.

He ran for governor of Nebraska in 1934 but was unsuccessful in getting the Democratic nomination and was also unsuccessful as a write-in candidate in 1934 for the United States Senate. He was a delegate to the Democratic National Conventions in 1924, 1928, 1932, 1940, and 1944. He was elected as a Democrat to the Eighty-first United States Congress when he defeated incumbent Republican Rep. Howard Buffett, the father of Warren Buffett. He served from January 3, 1949, to January 3, 1951. He unsuccessfully ran for reelection in 1950 to the Eighty-second United States Congress when Buffett defeated him to reclaim his old seat. He resumed the practice of law and died in Omaha on February 7, 1968. He is buried in Calvary Cemetery, in Omaha.

O'Sullivan was a Catholic, an Elk and a member of the Knights of Columbus and the Fraternal Order of Eagles.

U.S. House of Representatives
Preceded by Howard Buffett (R)	Member of the U.S. House of Representatives from Nebraska's 2nd congressional district January 3, 1949 – January 3, 1951	Succeeded by Howard Buffett (R)
