= Paolo Buffa =

Italian architect and furniture designer

Paolo Buffa (1903–1970) was an Italian architect and furniture designer.
