= Susan Thompson Buffett Foundation =

Nonprofit organization in Omaha, United States

- Formation: 1964
- Founder: Warren Buffett
- Founded at: Omaha, Nebraska
- Key people: Allen Greenberg (Executive Director)
- Website: https://buffettscholarships.org/

The Susan Thompson Buffett Foundation, previously The Buffett Foundation, is a 501(c)(3) non-profit charitable organization founded in 1964 in Omaha, Nebraska. It invests heavily in reproductive health and family planning grants across the world, including substantial investments in abortion and contraceptives. By 2008, it had nearly $4 billion in assets, and as of 2014, it ranked fourth among family foundations by grants paid.

== History ==
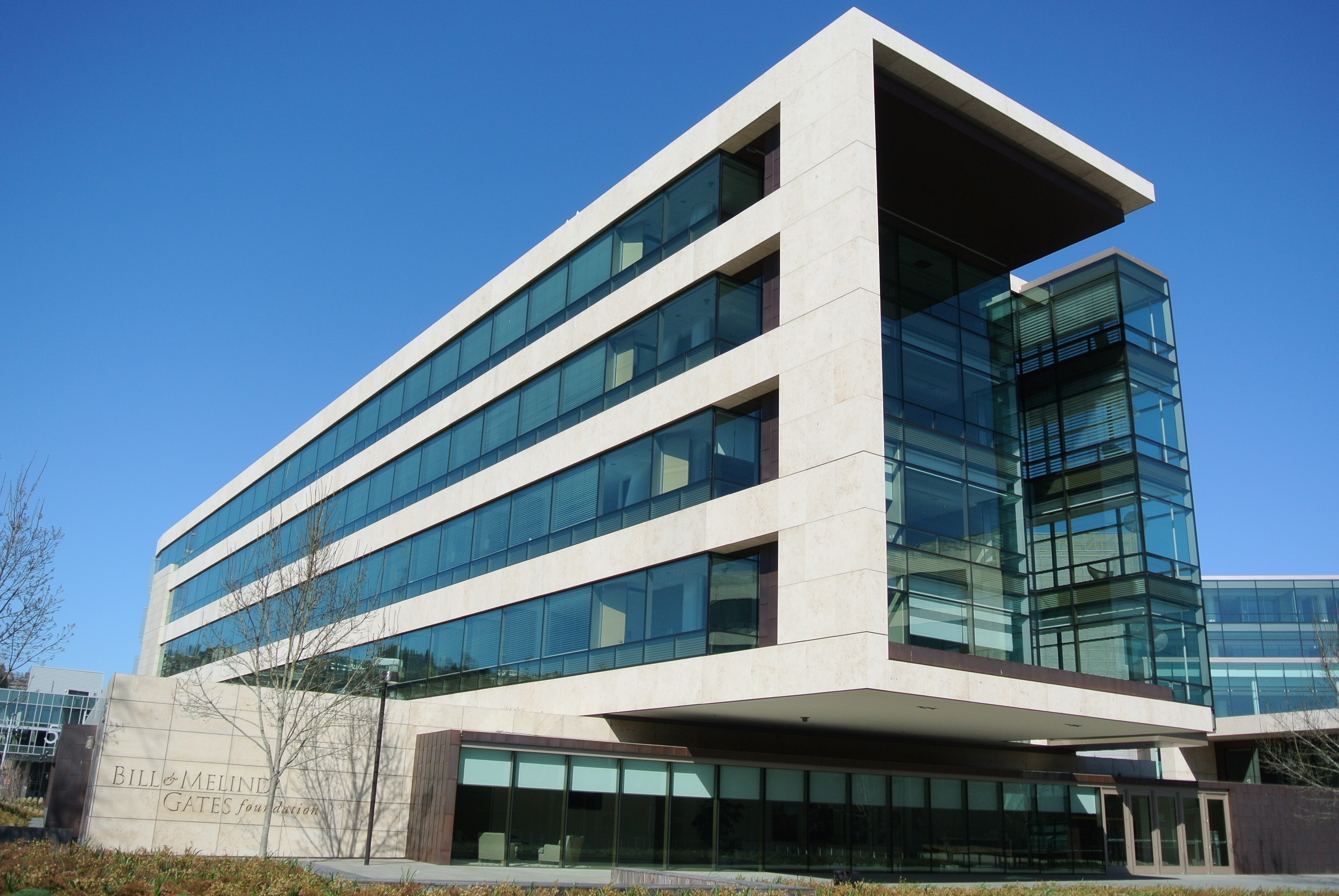
Bill & Melinda Gates Foundation in Seattle

The foundation provides grants to both U.S. and international organizations, including the Willows Foundation in Turkey (€2.3 million), the World Food Programme in Italy (€800,000), Marie Stopes International in the UK (€571,000), and Grupo de Informacion en Reproduccion Elegida in Mexico (€196,000). Though his original intention was to leave 99% of his estate to the Buffett Foundation, in June 2006 Warren Buffett announced he would give 85% of his wealth to the Bill & Melinda Gates Foundation instead, claiming he believed it would use his money effectively since it was already scaled-up.

When Susan Buffett died in 2004, the foundation was renamed in her honor.

== Advocacy ==
=== Pro Abortion ===
In the 1990s, the Buffett Foundation helped finance the development of the abortion drug RU-486. Between 2001 and 2014, the foundation contributed over $1.5 billion to abortion related causes, including at least $427 million to Planned Parenthood and $168 million to the National Abortion Federation. It has also funded the Guttmacher Institute, which tracks demographic and legislative trends, and Gynuity Health Projects, which focuses on medication abortion.

In 1999, the foundation contributed $2.5 million to International Projects Assistance Services (IPAS), a manufacturer based in Carrboro, North Carolina that makes handheld suction pumps for developing countries to initiate abortions. It was part of a five-year, $20 million commitment that enabled IPAS to double its capacity. At the end of that fiscal year, nearly $3.8 million of the $17.6 million donated went to Planned Parenthood.

=== Other initiatives ===
In 2007, Omaha's Building Bright Futures initiative promised financial support to low-income students in the area who wanted to attend college.
