= Iowa School for the Deaf =

State deaf school in Iowa, United States

Coordinates: 41.22464°N 95.82056°W

Location
- 3501 Harry Langdon Blvd. Council Bluffs, Iowa; United States

Information
- Type: State deaf school
- Established: 1855
- School district: Iowa Board of Regents
- Grades: Pre-K-12
- Enrollment: 110
- Mascot: Bobcats
- Website: http://www.iowaschoolforthedeaf.org

Iowa School for the Deaf is a pre-K to 12th grade school for deaf and hard-of-hearing students located in Council Bluffs, Iowa, United States. It serves students who live in Iowa and Nebraska.

== History ==
The founders of Iowa School for the Deaf were Edmund Booth and William E. Ijams. In 1854 Ijams opened a private school for the deaf in Iowa City. Following political activity by both men, a public institution was established on January 24, 1855, with the passage of Senate File No. 51. It was known as the Iowa Institute for the Deaf and Dumb. Twenty-one students, ranging from 12 to 28 years old, were the first pupils.

Due to lack of space, the school relocated to Council Bluffs in 1870. Council Bluffs was chosen because a large tract of land was obtained at a discounted price. The city had been declared the eastern terminus for the country's railroad system by Abraham Lincoln in 1863 and it was thought the railroad hub would provide accessible transportation for students across the state. The name Iowa School for the Deaf was adopted in 1892.

In 1998 ISD began admitting deaf students from Nebraska due to the closure of the Nebraska School for the Deaf.

Iowa School for the Deaf moved to Council Bluffs in 1870.

== Admissions ==
ISD is a referral-based school. Families, school districts and area education agencies are involved in the decision to educate a child at Iowa School for the Deaf. Deaf or hard-of-hearing children, residing in Iowa or Nebraska, who are at least 18 months old, may enroll. No tuition, room or board is charged. Most of Iowa School for the Deaf's appropriations are provided through state taxes. The Board of Regents, State of Iowa governs the school.

Preschool students may enroll at 18 months to aid language development. The elementary school consists of kindergarten through fourth grades; the middle school contains fifth through eighth grades; and the high school includes ninth through twelfth grades.

Its enrollment averages 110 local and boarding students from across the states of Iowa and Nebraska. Each year, ISD's itinerant faculty provides supplemental education to several dozen students who are deaf or hard of hearing but do not attend Iowa School for the Deaf.

== Academics ==
Preschool student enrollment begins at 18 months to aid in language development. The elementary school consists of kindergarten through fourth grades. The middle school contains fifth through eighth grades. The high school includes ninth through twelfth grades. Curriculum follows that of public schools, with a language emphasis in every class. The school year begins in August, ends in May, and has extended winter and spring breaks. Students travel to their homes every weekend on school-provided transportation.

== Boarding program ==
Boarding programs provide language immersion opportunities for students, many of whom are behind their hearing peers in vocabulary. Eighty percent of deaf or hard-of-hearing students are born to hearing families who aren't users of American Sign Language. Therefore, language-rich environments found in dormitories help offset gaps in students' language acquisition.

Students who are transported home daily are offered language programs after school. Preschool students do not stay overnight in ISD dorms.

Students living close by may return home every day after school or choose to stay in the dorms.

== Graduation ==
Students earn and are awarded diplomas by the Board of Regents, State of Iowa. Graduates meet the same academic requirements as hearing peers, as required by the Iowa Department of Education. Most students meet the requirements by the end of their senior year. In some circumstances, students may attend ISD until reaching 18 years of age. After graduation, most students pursue competitive work or post-secondary education at local, state, and national colleges and universities.

== Transition ==
A program providing support to students who complete graduate requirements is offered. Individuals enrolled into the 4PLUS program pursue college, work, or both. Students may take up to 12 credits per semester. 4PLUS students may work up to 30 hours weekly. There is no charge for the services; one-on-one tutoring and employment assistance, life skill instruction, room, board and transportation are provided without charge. Local school districts initially pay for tuition then are reimbursed. Students are responsible for purchasing college textbooks. Iowa's deaf and hard-of-hearing students from mainstreamed schools are also accepted into 4PLUS.

== Extracurricular activities ==
Students at Iowa School for the Deaf have dozens of activities in which they are encouraged to participate. Athletics, yearbook, honor society, service clubs are some structured activities. Field trips to United States Space Camp in Huntsville, Alabama and participation in Close Up in Washington, D.C., enhance the learning experiences. Leadership camps, dances, guest lecturers, bell choir, boys' and girls' clubs are others.

== Athletics ==
The Iowa School for the Deaf Bobcats participate in several sports, such as football, cheerleading, volleyball, basketball, track and Special Olympics. The Bobcats play against hearing teams which are typically junior varsity or private school teams, more closely matching school size. They also participate in the Great Plains Schools for the Deaf conference, which involves eight neighboring state schools for the deaf. GPSD - Iowa School for the Deaf - ISD, Minnesota State Academy for the Deaf - MSAD, Missouri School for the Deaf - MSD, Kansas School for the Deaf - KSD, Wisconsin School for the Deaf - WSD, Arkansas School for the Deaf - ASD, New Mexico School for the Deaf - NMSD, and Oklahoma School for the Deaf - OSD. Great Plains School for the Deaf's athletic conference was established in 1990.

== Alumni ==
- J. Schuyler Long, an ISD graduate and teacher, published the first sign language dictionary in 1909, A Manual of Signs. This is the first known text to instruct teachers on teaching sign language.
- Andrew Clemens (1857–1894) exited Iowa School for the Deaf in 1878. His sand art, made meticulously by inserting one grain of sand at a time in upside-down bottles, are sought by collectors.

== Faculty ==
- Henry Rothert, superintendent from 1887 to 1919

== Accreditation ==
ISD is accredited by the Conference of Educational Administrators of Schools and programs for the Deaf and holds accreditation from the North Central Association.
