= Doris Buffett =

American philanthropist (1928–2020)

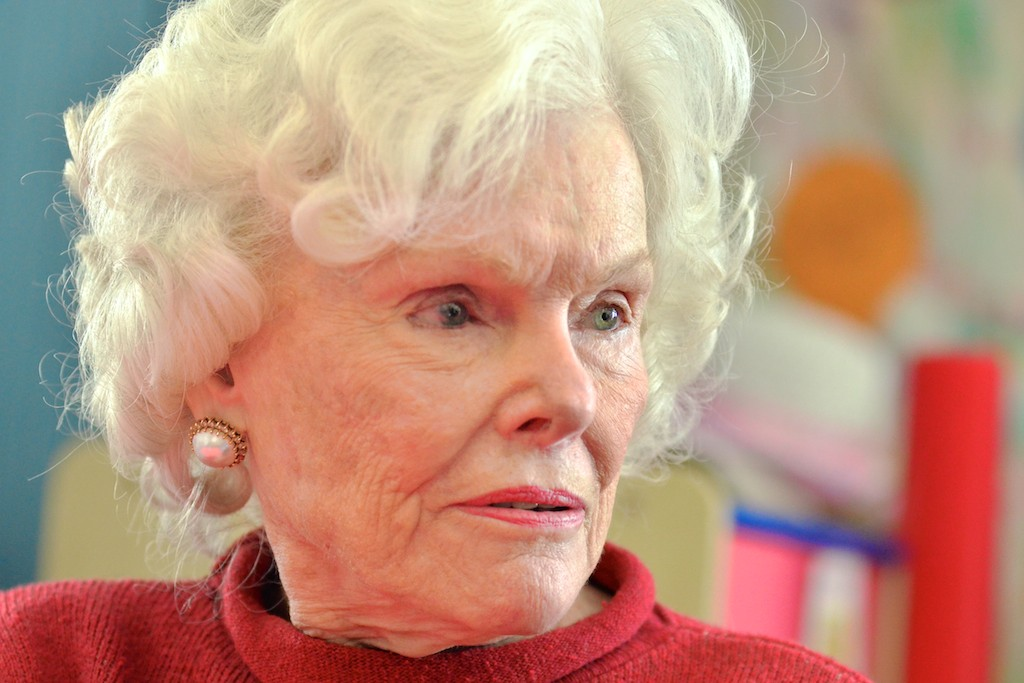
- Buffett in 2015
- Born: Doris Eleanor Buffett; February 12, 1928; Omaha, Nebraska, U.S.
- Died: August 4, 2020 (aged 92); Rockport, Maine, U.S.
- Years active: 1996–2020
- Known for: Philanthropy
- Notable work: Women's Independence Scholarship Program, Sunshine Lady Foundation, Learning By Giving Foundation, Letters Foundation
- Parent(s): Howard Buffett; Leila Stahl Buffett
- Family: Warren Buffett (brother); Peter Buffett (nephew); Susan Alice Buffett (niece); Howard Graham Buffett (nephew)
- Website: https://www.sunshinelady.org https://letters.foundation/ https://learningbygivingfoundation.org/

Doris Eleanor Buffett (February 12, 1928 – August 4, 2020) was an American philanthropist also known as the 'retail' philanthropist and the founder of The Sunshine Lady Foundation, The Learning By Giving Foundation, and The Letters Foundation which she co-founded alongside her younger brother, billionaire Warren Buffett. She was the daughter of Leila (Stahl) and U.S. politician and stockbroker Howard Homan Buffett. Doris Buffett intended to give all of her money away before she died.

== Life and career ==
Buffett was the granddaughter of Ernest Buffett, who operated a family grocery store in Omaha, Nebraska. Her father Howard Homan Buffett founded the Omaha-based investment business Buffett-Falk & Company in 1931. She was the oldest sister of Warren Buffett, the chief executive of Berkshire Hathaway, and the third-wealthiest person in the world. Buffett grew up in Omaha Nebraska, suffered through the Great Depression and saw frugal times as a young wife before her inheritance which eventually allowed her to do philanthropic work. She was married four times and fought two bouts with cancer.

Buffett attracted attention with the publication of a 2010 book titled, "Giving It All Away: The Doris Buffett Story," which was authored by Michael Zitz. The book, which she pursued at the urging of her brother Warren Buffett and the lead singer of U2 Bono, describes Doris' background and life as a philanthropist. Buffett donated $100 million of her own money, mostly to needy individuals, often taking the time to call and write to them personally and determine the best way to help. Through her Sunshine Lady Foundation, founded in 1996, she helped thousands of children get an education or attend camp, sponsored young women in Afghanistan and supported prison education programs, amongst other philanthropy work. Her goal was to give away her entire fortune, which remained substantial despite her generosity and the 2008 financial crisis.

In 1999, she established the Women's Independence Scholarship Program to provide financial and other support to survivors of intimate partner violence who had escaped their abuser to pursue higher education. The program was started to partner with her friends who had founded a shelter for domestic violence victims. In 2008, she endowed it with $30 million making it its own organization, naming the associated scholarship the Doris Buffett Independent Scholar grant. She said it was the project she was most proud of, celebrating an award winner for attending the Wharton School. As of 2016, the scholarship had awarded more than $35 million to 2,000 women. According to Rita Smith, the executive director of the National Coalition Against Domestic Violence, abusive partners often sabotage attempts to further their education, and it is one of the most common and significant issues faced by survivors.

She established the Letters Foundation alongside her brother Warren Buffett to provide humanitarian grants to people experiencing a crisis through no fault of their own when no other options exist. A hand-up and not hand-out was her philanthropy principle. Her brother Warren Buffett helped fund some of the foundation's early projects though later she began providing funds herself from Berkshire Hathaway stocks she owned. Unlike brother Warren Buffett who grants in 'wholesale', Doris Buffett believed in small and direct grants to people with financial difficulties hence the nickname 'retail' philanthropist. "She is far more philanthropic than I am. She identifies with the underdog. I do it in a wholesale way, but not on a one-on-one basis. She really wants to know their stories," Warren Buffett said to The Wall Street Journal.

Doris Buffett also established the Learning By Giving Foundation which promotes the study of experiential philanthropy at colleges and universities across the United States. At the end of the semester, students are given real money to grant to local nonprofits in their community. Doris said the goal of Learning by Giving is to instill in students, "the urge to do things for others all of their lives; to see the need to do something, to be an activist, to work toward social justice." She believed that this program will not only outlive her, but also create a ripple effect that will inspire generations to come.

Buffett made her home in Fredericksburg, Virginia, and moved to Boston in 2016 to be closer to family, and to receive treatment for Alzheimer's disease.

In December 2018, Doris released a second book titled Letters to Doris: One Woman's Quest to Help Those With Nowhere Else to Turn.

Buffett died on August 4, 2020, at her home in Rockport, Maine, at the age of 92.

== See also ==
- Warren Buffett
- Howard Buffett
- Peter Buffett
- Susan Alice Buffett
