= Kim Robertson (musician) =

American Celtic harp player

- Born: Wisconsin, United States
- Genres: Celtic
- Instrument(s): Harp, piano
- Website: www.kimrobertson.net

Kim Robertson is an American Celtic harp player. She was born in the U.S. state of Wisconsin and classically trained on piano and orchestral harp. Her work encompasses over 20 album projects, several volumes of harp arrangements, instructional videos, and an international itinerary of concerts and retreats. She has recorded for several labels, including Gourd Music, Narada, Sugo, Invincible, and for the Crimson Series of Gurmukhi meditation music in collaboration with vocalist Singh Kaur. She has also collaborated with cellist Virginia Kron, with flutists Steve Kujala, Bettine Clemen, Brett Lipshutz, and in the Celtic trio Ferintosh with cellist Abby Newton and fiddler David Greenberg.

== Discography ==
- Forget Not The Angels (2014) -Gourd Music
- Christmas Lullaby, Vol II (2017) -Gourd Music
- Shall We Gather (2012) -Gourd Music
- Shady Grove (2009) – Gourd Music
- Tender Shepherd (1992) – Gourd Music
- Highland Heart (2006) – Gourd Music
- Christmas Lullaby (2004) – Gourd Music
- Searching for Lambs (2003) – Gourd Music
- Q&A (2013) -with Sharlene Wallace
- Fig for a Kiss (2019) -with Brett Lipshutz
- Dance to Your Shadow (2001)
- Crimson Collection, Vols. 6 and 7 (1999) - with Singh Kaur
- The Spiral Gate (1999)
- Lullaby Journey (1996)
- Wood, Fire & Gold (1996)
- Treasures of the Celtic Harp (1995)
- Celtic Christmas II (1994)
- Gratitude (1990)
- Wild Iris (1989) - with Steve Kujala
- Joy! Joy! Joy! (1995) - with Steve Kujala
- Celtic Christmas I (1987)
- Moonrise (1987)
- Windshadows II (1986)
- Windshadows Vol. 1 (1983)
- Water Spirit (2008)
- Angels in Disguise (2003)
- Love Song to a Planet (2005) with Bettine Clemen
