= Susan Alice Buffett =

American philanthropist (born 1953)

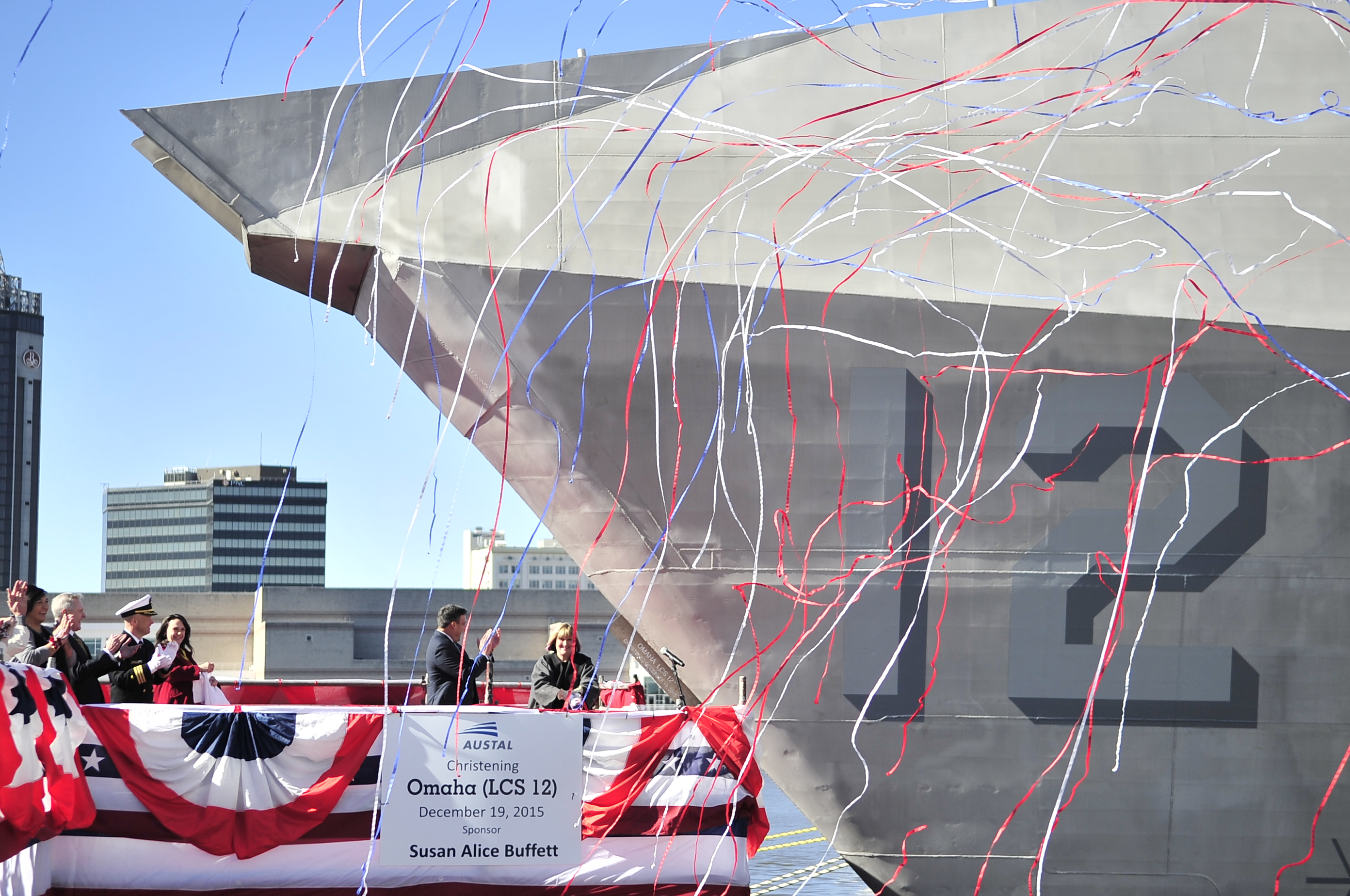
- Susan A. Buffet breaks a bottle across a ship's bow during the christening ceremony of a littoral combat ship she sponsored at Austal USA shipyard in Mobile, Alabama.
- Born: July 30, 1953 (age 73); Omaha, Nebraska, U.S.
- Other name: Susie Buffett
- Spouse: Allen Greenberg (m. 1983; div. 1995) John Thomas Foley (m. 2017; died 2024)
- Children: 2
- Parent(s): Warren Buffett; Susan Thompson Buffett
- Relatives: Buffett family

Susan Alice Buffett is an American philanthropist who is the eldest child and only daughter of Warren Buffett and Susan Thompson Buffett. Her charitable work has focused largely on the Sherwood Foundation and the Buffett Early Childhood Fund, organizations in Omaha that provide grants in public education, human services, and social justice in the interest of promoting the welfare of children from lower-income families.

== Biography ==
Born in Omaha in 1953, Buffett, commonly called Susie, is the eldest child of Warren Buffett. She attended the University of Nebraska–Lincoln, where she majored in home economics, and studied at the University of California, Irvine, where she majored in social ecology. After college she started working at Century 21 Real Estate, where she initially worked as an assistant to Arthur E. Bartlett. She then moved to Washington, D.C. and took a job at the New Republic.

Her parents lived separately from the late 1970s onwards, though they remained married until her mother's death in 2004. Despite his wealth, Warren Buffett encouraged his children to be financially independent; Susan Buffett recalled in 2006 that, though he was typically very generous, he once refused her a personal loan of $41,000 to expand her kitchen.

In 1983, Buffett wed Allen Greenberg, a lawyer for Public Citizen, whom she had met in Washington. In 1987, Greenberg became the first director of the Buffett Foundation, a title he retained after the couple's divorce in 1995.

Buffett established the Sherwood Foundation in 1999 to fund local groups in the Omaha area. In 2005 she founded the Buffett Early Childhood Fund to fund philanthropy centered on childhood, and to help children from disadvantaged backgrounds. She also help support Daniel Beaty's show on race in the United States. As of 2010, Buffett was the chair of three of the Buffett Foundations - the Sherwood Foundation, the Susan Thompson Buffett Foundation, and the Buffett Early Childhood Fund, which are located on the Conagra campus in Omaha.

Buffett also became involved in the Omaha Community Foundation, a local nonprofit that works to improve the quality of life for residents of the Omaha area. According to a 2010 interview with her brother Howard Graham Buffett, Buffett's philanthropic focus has consistently remained on children, education and family issues, but she has also committed to other causes, including The ONE Campaign, a non-governmental organization dedicated to various improvements in Africa. In 2015 Buffett did the honors of breaking a bottle of champagne on the bow of the USS Omaha (LCS-12).

Buffett has been active in Democratic politics, and in 2013 Hillary Clinton came to Omaha to join Buffett's 60th birthday celebration.

In 2021 it was announced that Buffett had joined the board of Berkshire Hathaway, and two years later she and her two siblings were entrusted with the sizeable task of donating all their father's wealth to foundations of their choice following his death, at which time regular donations to the Gates Foundation will cease.

== Honors and awards ==
In 2014 the United Way named her Citizen of the Year.
