= Howard Buffett =

American businessman (1903–1964)

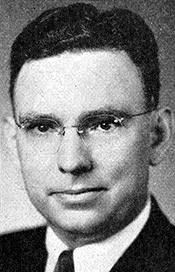

Member of the U.S. House of Representatives from Nebraska's 2nd district
- In office January 3, 1951 – January 3, 1953
- Preceded by: Eugene D. O'Sullivan
- Succeeded by: Roman L. Hruska
- In office January 3, 1943 – January 3, 1949
- Preceded by: Charles F. McLaughlin
- Succeeded by: Eugene D. O'Sullivan

Personal details
- Born: Howard Horman Buffett; August 13, 1903 Omaha, Nebraska, U.S.
- Died: April 30, 1964 (aged 60) Omaha, Nebraska, U.S.
- Resting place: Forest Lawn Memorial Park
- Party: Republican
- Spouse: Leila Stahl (m. 1925)
- Children: 3, including Doris, Warren
- Education: University of Nebraska (BA)

Howard Homan Buffett (August 13, 1903 – April 30, 1964) was an American businessman, investor, and politician. He was a four-term Republican United States representative for the state of Nebraska. He was the father of Warren Buffett, the businessman and investor.

== Early life ==
Howard Buffett was born in Omaha, Nebraska, to Henrietta Duvall Buffett and Ernest P. Buffett, owners of a grocery business. Ernest P. Buffett's parents were second cousins, both having mainly English descent. The Buffet surname (renamed to Buffett) originates in France with a Huguenot weaver, named John Buffett, who became Buffett's first American Buffett ancestor when he emigrated to New York in the late-1600s.

Howard Buffett attended public schools and graduated from the University of Nebraska in Lincoln, Nebraska, in 1925. While a student, Buffett was a brother of the Alpha Sigma Phi fraternity. He married Leila Stahl on December 27, 1925. The Buffetts were active members of the Dundee Presbyterian Church. After failing to secure a job in the family grocery business, he started a small stock brokerage firm.

== Career ==
Entering the investment business, Buffett also served on the Omaha board of education from 1939 to 1942. In 1942 he ran for the U.S. House of Representatives in the Nebraska district in which Omaha was located. In that election, Buffett was seen as "a Republican sacrificial lamb in Nebraska's second district when FDR was a popular wartime leader." Nevertheless, he went on to win the Republican nomination in the primary and then the subsequent general election.

He was reelected twice. In 1948 he again was the Republican nominee for another term, but was defeated for reelection; however, he was the Republican nominee for the office again in 1950 and won the office back. In 1952 Buffett decided against seeking another term and returned to his investment business in Omaha, Buffett-Falk & Co., in which he worked until shortly before his death. He also served as the campaign manager for conservative Senator Robert A. Taft in Taft's 1952 presidential campaign.

According to Warren Buffett biographer Roger Lowenstein:

'Unshakably ethical, Howard refused offers of junkets and even turned down a part of his pay. During his first term, when congressional salary was raised from $10,000 to $12,500, Howard left the extra money in the Capitol disbursement office, insisting that he had been elected at the lower salary.' His wife said he considered only one issue when deciding whether or not to vote for a bill: 'Will this add to, or subtract from, human liberty?'

=== Political philosophy ===
Howard Buffett is remembered for his highly libertarian Old Right stance, having maintained a friendship with Murray Rothbard for a number of years. He "would invariably draw 'zero' ratings from the Americans for Democratic Action and other leftist groups."

Buffett was a vocal critic of the Truman Doctrine and the Marshall Plan. Of the Truman Doctrine, he said: "Our Christian ideals cannot be exported to other lands by dollars and guns." Buffett was also "one of the major voices in Congress opposed to the Korean adventure," and "was convinced that the United States was largely responsible for the eruption of conflict in Korea; for the rest of his life he tried unsuccessfully to get the Senate Armed Services Committee to declassify the testimony of CIA head Admiral Roscoe H. Hillenkoetter, which Buffett told [Rothbard] established American responsibility for the Korean outbreak." The CIA failed to predict the Marxist invasion of the Republic of Korea in 1950, just as it had failed to predict the Soviet Atomic Bomb the previous year, it was these intelligence failures that Rear Admiral Hillenkoetter testified about.

Speaking on the floor of Congress, he opposed military interventionism:

Even if it were desirable, America is not strong enough to police the world by military force. If that attempt is made, the blessings of liberty will be replaced by coercion and tyranny at home. Our Christian ideals cannot be exported to other lands by dollars and guns. Persuasion and example are the methods taught by the Carpenter of Nazareth, and if we believe in Christianity we should try to advance our ideals by his methods. We cannot practice might and force abroad and retain freedom at home. We cannot talk world cooperation and practice power politics.

In the summer of 1962, he wrote "an impassioned plea... for the abolition of the draft" in the New Individualist Review. Buffett wrote:

When the American government conscripts a boy to go 10,000 miles to the jungles of Asia without a declaration of war by Congress (as required by the Constitution) what freedom is safe at home? Surely, profits of U.S. Steel or your private property are not more sacred than a young man's right to life.

In addition to non-interventionism overseas, Howard Buffett strongly supported the gold standard because he believed it would limit the ability of government to inflate the money supply and spend beyond its means. His son Warren Buffett is not an advocate of the gold standard.

== Personal life ==
Buffett married Leila Stahl Buffett (March 18, 1904 – August 30, 1996). Together, they had three children, one son and two daughters:

- Doris Buffett (1928–2020), a philanthropist who was married four times.
- Warren Buffett (b. 1930), a businessman, investor, and philanthropist, Chairman & former CEO of Berkshire Hathaway.
- Roberta "Bertie" Buffett (b. 1933), a philanthropist who has been married three times; first to Charlie Snorf in 1955, then to Dr. Hilton Bialek. Upon his death in 2002, she married David Elliott, in 2007. He died in 2017.

Howard Buffett died on May 30, 1964, at the age of 60, from cancer.

== Publications ==
- Buffett, Howard Homan. Human Freedom Rests on Gold Redeemable Money, Financial Chronicle 5/6/48
- Buffett, Howard Homan. The Evil Men in the Kremlin Must Be Chortling as Militarism Runs Wild in America. Washington, U.S. Government Printing Office, 1952.

U.S. House of Representatives
Preceded by Charles F. McLaughlin	Member of the U.S. House of Representatives from Nebraska's 2nd congressional district 1943–1949	Succeeded by Eugene D. O'Sullivan
Preceded by Eugene D. O'Sullivan	Member of the U.S. House of Representatives from Nebraska's 2nd congressional district 1951–1953	Succeeded by Roman L. Hruska
