= Progress Residential =

American owner of rental homes

- Type: Subsidiary
- Industry: Private equity
- Founded: 2012; 14 years ago
- Headquarters: Scottsdale, Arizona,
- Parent: Pretium Partners
- Website: rentprogress.com

Progress Residential is an American single-family rental company headquartered in Scottsdale, Arizona. It is a wholly owned subsidiary of Pretium Partners and manages rental homes and build-to-rent communities in U.S. markets.

Founded in 2012, the company quickly became one of the largest institutional operators of single-family rental homes in the United States. As of late 2022, Progress Residential owned 85,000 homes, the second largest owner of single-family rental homes in the US after Invitation Homes. Progress Residential owns office locations in 26 cities throughout the United States.

== History ==
Progress was founded to buy and refurbish rental properties in September 2012 by Pretium Partners. In 2021, Pretium acquired Front Yard Residential, another single-family rental company. The deal added 14,000 homes to Progress Residential's portfolio, increasing it to 55,000 properties in 2021. As of late 2022, Progress Residential owned 85,000 homes.
