= Tamara Gustavson =

American billionaire

- Born: Tamara Hughes; 1961 (age 64–65)
- Education: University of Southern California (BS)
- Known for: 11% stake in Public Storage
- Spouse: Eric Gustavson (m. 1993)
- Children: 2
- Relatives: B. Wayne Hughes (father); B. Wayne Hughes Jr. (brother)

Tamara Hughes Gustavson (born 1961) is an American billionaire businesswoman. The daughter of Public Storage co-founder and chairman B. Wayne Hughes, Gustavson is Public Storage's largest shareholder, owning 11% of the company. As of May 2026, she had an estimated net worth of US$8.6 billion.

== Early life and education ==
Gustavson was born in 1961 to B. Wayne Hughes and Marjorie McKechnie. She has one older brother, B. Wayne Hughes Jr. She graduated from San Marino High School in 1979. Gustavson attended the University of Southern California, and was a member of the Pi Beta Phi sorority. She graduated in 1983 with a Bachelor of Science in public affairs.

== Career ==
Gustavson joined Public Storage in 1983. She worked at the company for twenty years, rising to senior vice president before leaving in 2003. She joined the company's board of trustees in 2008 and, as of 2022, was the largest shareholder with an 11% stake. In 2016, with an estimated net worth of $4.9 billion, she established herself as the wealthiest person in the state of Kentucky.

Gustavson was on the board of directors of the USC-CHLA Institute for Pediatric Clinical Research from 2004 to 2008, and has served as Director of the William Lawrence & Blanche Hughes Foundation.

In 2016, Gustavson joined the board of American Homes 4 Rent, a publicly traded REIT specializing in single-family rental homes founded by B. Wayne Hughes. She became chairwoman of its board in May 2019. In 2020, she ranked 154 on the Forbes 400 with a net worth of $4.6 billion. In October 2022, Forbes estimated her net worth at $7.3 billion.

== Personal life ==
Gustavson married her husband Eric in 1993. They have two children and live in Lexington, Kentucky. She and her husband own Spendthrift Farm, a Thoroughbred race horse breeding farm in Kentucky that is home to ten Kentucky Derby winners and the Hall of Fame mare Beholder.

In May 2022, Gustavson had put her Malibu property on sale for $127.5 million. In October 2022, American businessman Byron Allen bought the property for $100 million.
