= Tricon Residential =

Canadian real estate company

Tricon
- Formerly: Tricon Capital
- Traded as: TSX: TCN NYSE: TCN
- Industry: Real Estate
- Founded: June 3, 1988; 38 years ago
- Founders: Geoffrey Matus; David Berman
- Headquarters: Toronto, Ontario, Canada
- Key people: Gary Berman, CEO
- AUM: $8.2 billion
- Number of employees: 1,000+
- Website: US: triconhomes.com; CA: triconliving.com

Tricon Residential (commonly known as Tricon) is a North American residential real estate company that operates in the United States and Canada. Tricon's two subsidiaries own, operate, and develop rental housing: Tricon Homes, a U.S.-based company focused on single-family rental homes in the United States, and Tricon Living, a Canadian company focused on multi-family purpose-built apartments in Canada.

Tricon was founded in Toronto, Ontario in 1988 by David Berman and Geoffrey Matus, and grew into a major housing developer and operator under Gary Berman, David Berman's son, who joined the company in 2002 and became CEO in 2015. The company listed on the Toronto Stock Exchange in 2010 and subsequently on the New York Stock Exchange in 2021.

== History ==
=== Founding to IPO (1988–2009) ===
Tricon Capital Group was founded in Toronto in 1988 by David Berman and Geoffrey Matus.

Tricon raised approximately $1 billion in equity between 2009 and 2012, which it used to increase supply in high-growth Sun Belt markets in the United States in response to growing migration and the resulting need for new housing. Tricon's expansion into U.S. single-family rentals followed a broader post-financial crisis shift in which institutional investors entered the single-family rental market with the support of the Federal Housing Finance Agency.

In May 2010, Tricon completed an initial public offering on the Toronto Stock Exchange, raising C$63 million. The company's prospectus argued that the weakness in the U.S. housing market had driven many U.S.-based housing providers and construction firms out of the market, creating an opportunity for new investment and a chance to increase the supply of housing in the country.

=== U.S. single-family rental expansion (2012–2016) ===
In April 2012, Tricon entered the U.S. single-family rental market through a newly formed subsidiary, Tricon American Homes, which it officially launched in September 2014. The company focuses on serving middle-class households and workforce families looking to rent a single-family home rather than an apartment.

Tricon acquired an undisclosed percentage of the parent company of Houston-based Johnson Development Corp., a developer of for-sale homes, for $18.5 million in 2014. The company is "partially owned" by Tricon, and it has more than 80,000 for-sale residential homes. The equity investment by Tricon built on a project-level partnership between the two companies that dated to 2012. Tricon has retained its strategic ownership stake in the years since. The two firms have collaborated on a pipeline of for-sale and build-to-rent (BTR) master-planned communities, including a September 2024 BTR community in Leander, near Austin, Texas, and in an Arlington, Texas planned community.

In 2015, Gary Berman, who joined the company in 2002, became CEO. His father David, one of Tricon's co-founders, became Executive Chairman. During this period, Tricon explored an expansion into upscale manufactured home communities in Arizona, Florida, and California to meet growing demand in the region.

=== Silver Bay acquisition and portfolio growth (2017–2019) ===
Tricon acquired the American real estate investment trust Silver Bay Realty Trust in a 2017 transaction with a total value of approximately $1.4 billion. The combined portfolio of Tricon American Homes and Silver Bay created the fourth-largest publicly owned single-family rental company in the United States, with over 16,800 homes in 18 markets across 10 states.

The company later formed a $2 billion joint venture in 2018 targeting the addition of up to 10,000 additional units in the Sun Belt. In 2019, it formed a $450 million joint venture with the Arizona State Retirement System to develop BTR communities. In December 2019, Tricon added 708 single-family homes to its portfolio in the Nashville, Tennessee suburbs from Invitation Homes.

=== Initial equity investment and rebranding (2020–2022) ===
Blackstone Group made a $300 million minority equity investment in Tricon in August 2020, marking the private equity firm's return to the single-family rental sector following its earlier exit from Invitation Homes. Tricon further sold an 80% stake in its U.S. multi-family portfolio of 23 apartment properties to two institutional investors for $425 million, using the proceeds to repay debt as the first phase of a planned $1.2 billion equity raise to allow it to acquire more assets. In March 2021, the company formed a joint venture with the Canada Pension Plan Investment Board to develop up to 3,000 rental apartments across the Greater Toronto Area, with up to C$500 million in committed capital for the plan. That same year, the company completed a rebranding from Tricon Capital Group Inc. to Tricon Residential Inc. following shareholder approval.

In 2021, Tricon held a portfolio of 23 multi-family residential properties totaling 7,289 suites in 13 major markets primarily in the U.S. Sun Belt region. Tricon sold an 80% stake in these units, and no longer invests in multi-family rental units like apartment buildings in the United States.

Tricon announced a $5 billion joint venture with the Teacher Retirement System of Texas and the Pacific Life Insurance company to add approximately 18,000 single-family rental homes to its portfolio across the Sun Belt over the next three years.

=== Activist investor campaign and company acquisition (2023–present) ===
Activist investor Land & Buildings Investment Management disclosed a stake of approximately 6.2 million shares in Tricon in October 2023 and characterized the company as "substantially undervalued." The firm argued that Tricon's per-home investments and maintenance were more than those of comparable single-family rental companies, and that increasing rents on tenants could generate a more than 20% earnings increase. Tricon resisted the proposed changes.

In January 2024, Blackstone announced an agreement to acquire Tricon for approximately $3.5 billion. Blackstone pledged an additional $1 billion in capital improvements to Tricon's existing U.S. homes and committed to completing Tricon's approximately $3.5 billion development pipeline. At the time of the deal, Tricon held approximately 38,000 single-family rental homes in the United States as well as apartment buildings and development land in Toronto. The transaction closed on May 1, 2024. Since the acquisition, Tricon Homes has continued to expand, and the subsidiary now manages 65,000 single-family rental units.

== Subsidiaries and properties ==
Tricon operates through two main subsidiaries: Tricon Homes, its U.S. single-family rental business, and Tricon Living, its Canadian multi-family rental business.

=== Tricon Homes ===
Tricon Homes, Tricon's U.S. single-family rental subsidiary, currently manages approximately 65,000 single-family rental homes across the U.S. Sun Belt, including in high-growth markets such as Atlanta, Charlotte, Dallas, Tampa, and Phoenix. In August 2025, the company broke ground on a 93-home single-family community in Simpsonville, South Carolina in a $20 million investment offering three-bedroom, two-bathroom move-in-ready units in Greenville County.

In July 2025, the company unveiled new homes in a master-planned community in Arlington, Texas, and said the development included financial programs such as on-time rent payment reporting to credit bureaus and down payment assistance intended to help residents build their credit scores and support pathways to homeownership. Arlington Mayor Jim Ross noted that he was happy to see the developer "address the urgent need for more housing options in our community."

Tricon Homes operates a resident program called Tricon Vantage, which provides financial literacy classes on budgeting and credit improvement. Residents who remain in a Tricon Homes property for five years are eligible for a $5,000 grant toward a home purchase down payment on any home in the U.S.

=== Tricon Living ===
Tricon Living, Tricon's Canadian multi-family subsidiary, has developed purpose-built rental apartments in the Greater Toronto Area, often in partnership with pension funds, developers, and public sector partners. It owns and operates twelve purpose-built rental communities in the city, including The Selby, a 441-unit building near Bloor Street in downtown Toronto that opened in 2019 and incorporated heritage elements from the former Selby Hotel, and The Taylor, a 286-unit tower on Spadina Avenue.

By March 2020, the subsidiary had roughly 3,600 rental units across seven high-rise projects at various stages of development. Its largest to date is Cherry House, an 855-unit development in Toronto's Canary District that opened in 2026, with about 30 percent of units designated as affordable housing and amenities built to support high-performance athletes, including Canadian Olympians and Paralympians. Cherry House anchors a broader redevelopment of the Canary District that Tricon Living is delivering through a public-private partnership with the City of Toronto, the Province of Ontario, and the Government of Canada.
