= Penn-Fallsway, Baltimore =

Neighborhood in Baltimore

Penn-Fallsway
- Neighborhood of Baltimore
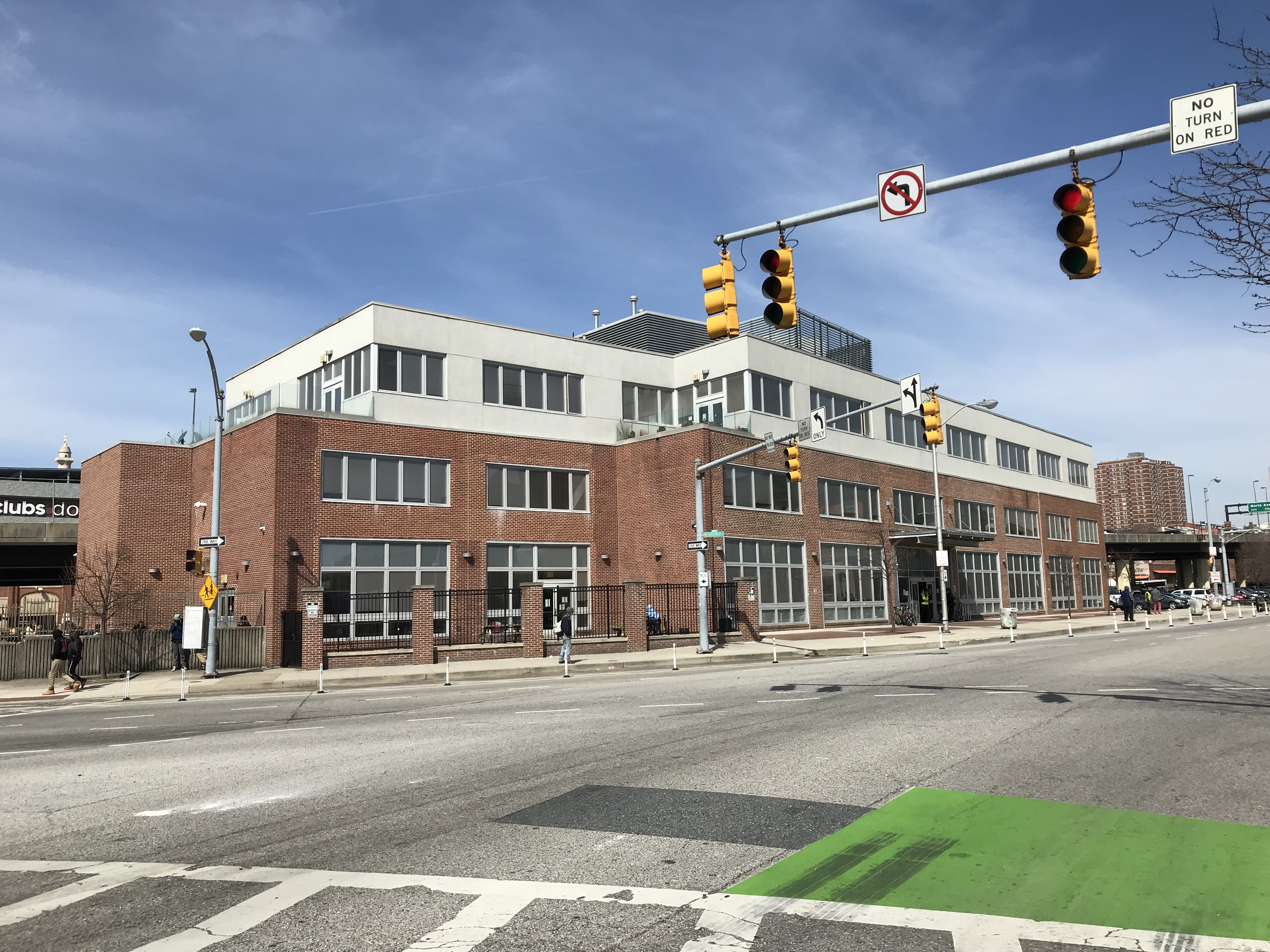
- Weinberg Housing and Resource Center at intersection of East Centre Street and Fallsway in Penn-Fallsway, Baltimore

- Location within Baltimore Location within Maryland Location within the United States
- Coordinates: 39.2970°N 76.6088°W
- Country: United States
- State: Maryland
- City: Baltimore
- City Council: District 12

Area
  - Total: 0.1332 sq mi (0.345 km^{2})

Population (2020)
  - Total: 2,250
  - Density: 16,888/sq mi (6,520/km^{2})
- Time zone: UTC−5 (Eastern)
  - Summer (DST): UTC−4 (EDT)
- ZIP Codes: 21202
- Area Codes: 410, 443, 667

Penn-Fallsway is a neighborhood in southeast Baltimore. The neighborhood formerly included the Maryland Penitentiary before its demolition in 2020. Penn-Fallsway is the site of multiple state- and city-operated facilities and non-profit organizations, as well as some commercial buildings.

== Geography ==
Penn-Fallsway is bounded by East Eager Street to the north; North Gay Street to the south; Homewood Avenue, McKim Street, Greenmount Avenue, Hillen Street, and North Exeter Street to the east; and the Jones Falls Expressway (I-83) to the west. Adjacent neighborhoods are Johnston Square (north), Old Town (east), Jonestown (southeast), Downtown (southwest), Mount Vernon (west), and Mid-Town Belvedere (northeast).

=== Fallsway ===
Fallsway is the street adjacent to the Jones Falls Expressway at the western edge of the Penn-Fallsway area. It carries northbound traffic to Guilford Avenue. The Fallsway was constructed under Mayor James H. Preston from 1911 to 1916 to channel and cover over the Jones Falls watercourse, preventing deadly overflows downtown. The city of Baltimore spent two million dollars on the construction of retaining walls along the Jones Falls, and an equal amount to accommodate railroad lines and subways.

A portion of the Jones Falls Trail runs along Fallsway. The Jones Falls Trail is a 10-mile marked cycling circuit running along a route which has a long history as a transportation corridor for Baltimore City.

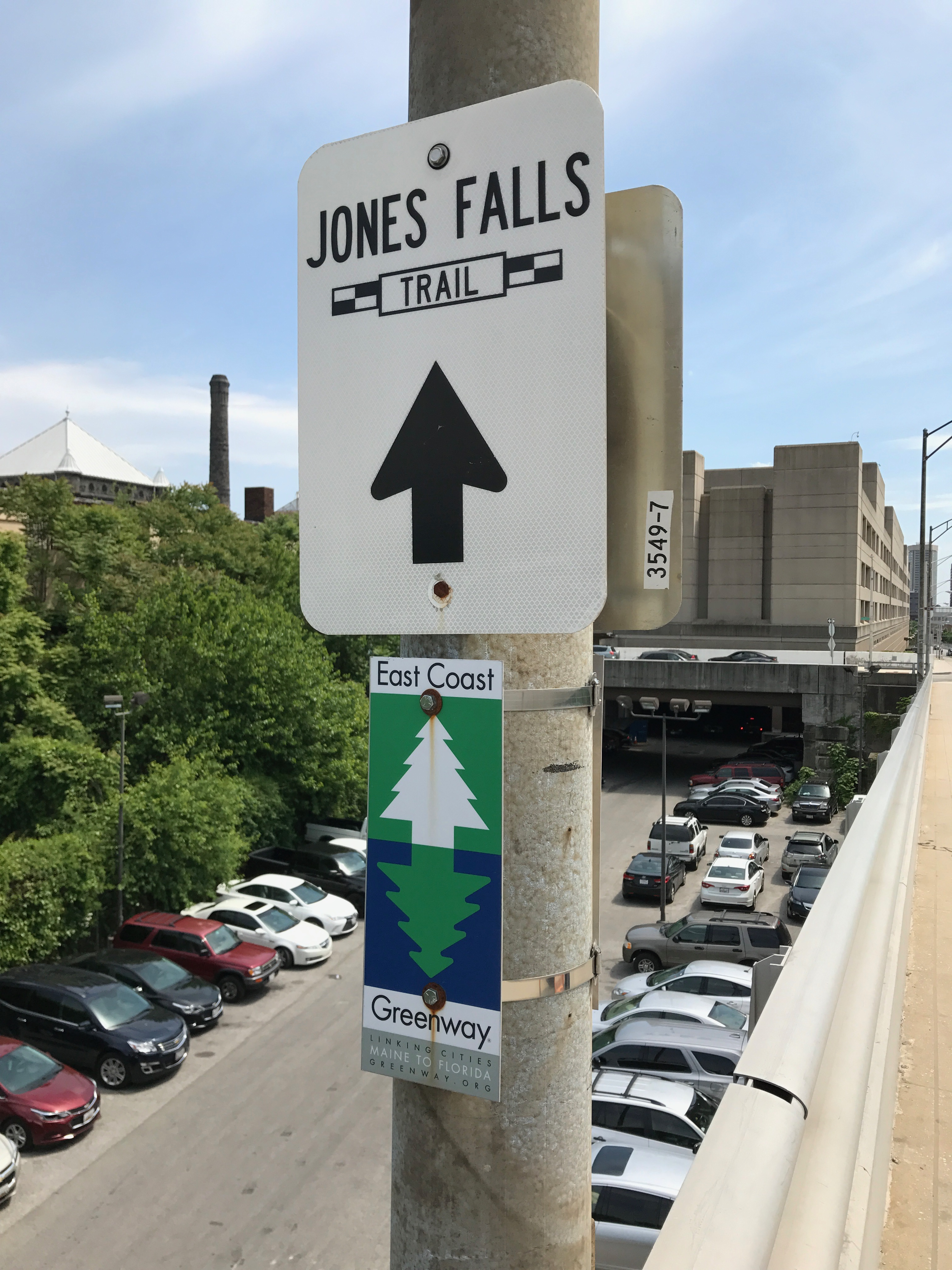
Signage for the Jones Falls trail near Fallsway and East Chase Street, north of Penn-Fallsway

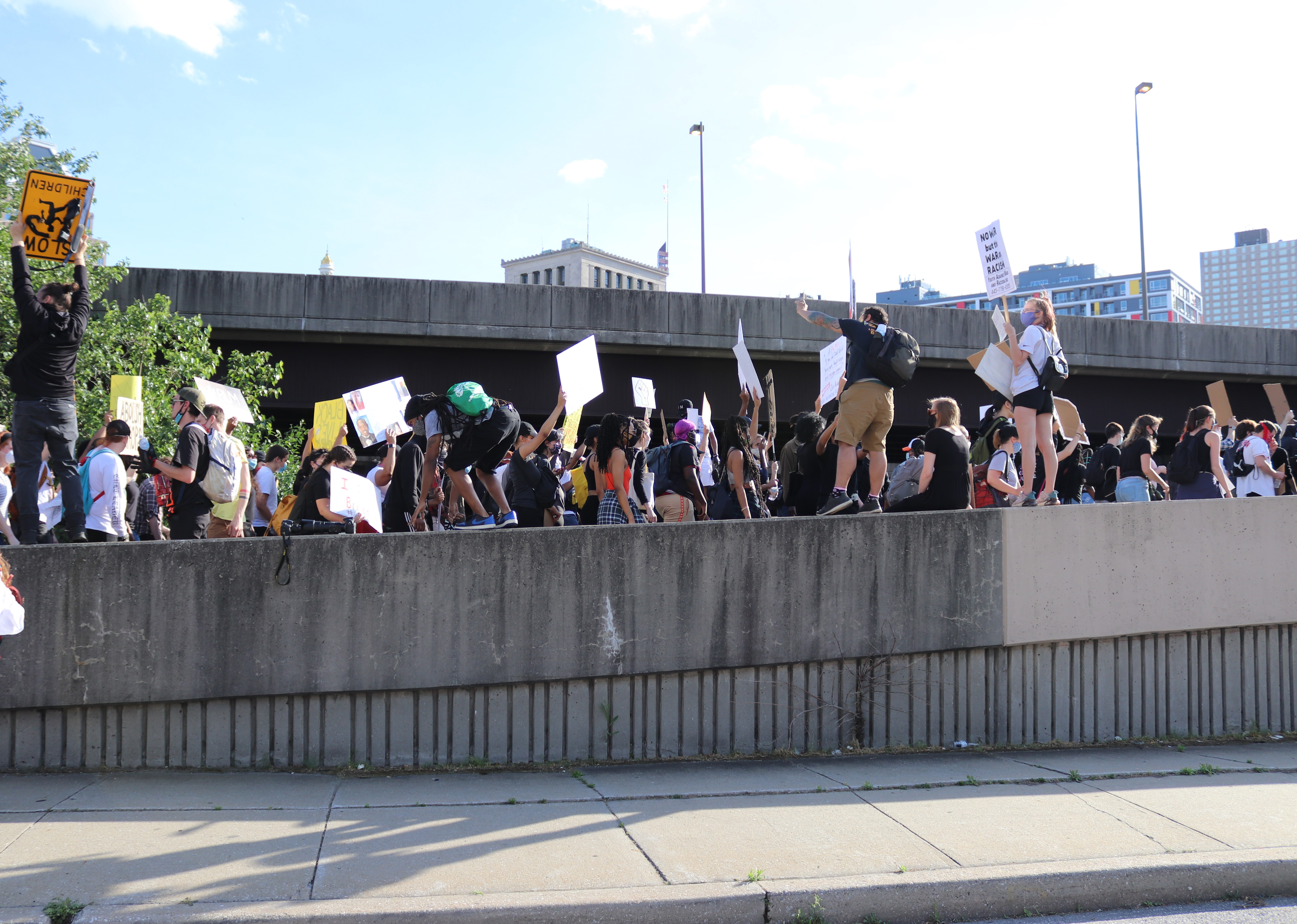
View of the Jones Falls Expressway entrance ramp near Fallsway during a Justice for George Floyd protest in 2020

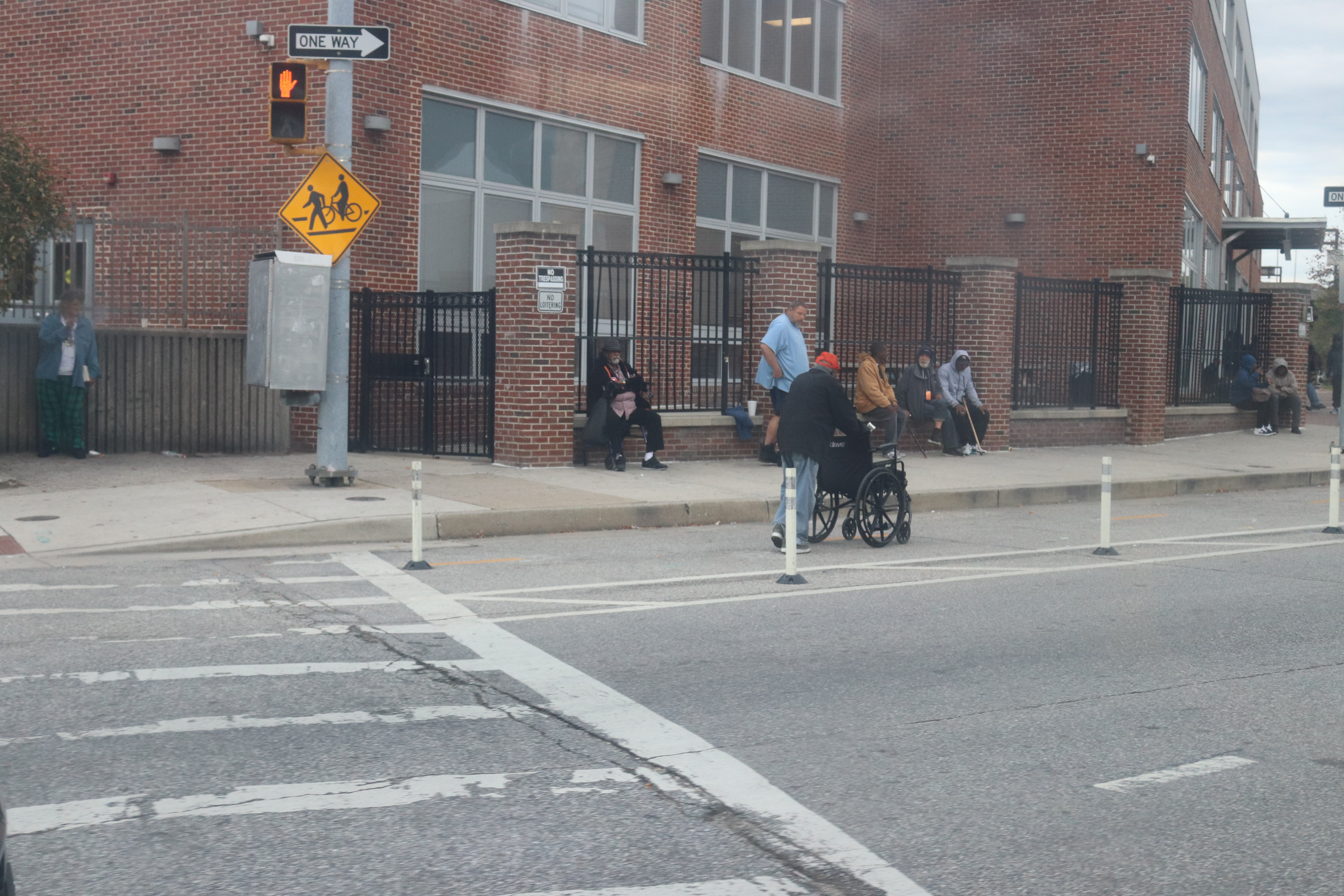
View from MTA bus at the intersection of East Centre Street and Fallsway

== Facilities ==
=== Homeless services ===
The Weinberg Housing and Resource Center, a shelter for homeless adults was opened in Penn-Fallsway by the city of Baltimore in 2011. The center has been operated by the Catholic Charities organization since 2013.

Health Care for the Homeless, a non-profit organization, operates a facility in Penn-Fallsway as well. The organization has been tasked with providing vaccinations and addressing drug use and addiction.

=== Parking enforcement ===
The Baltimore City Department of Transportation operates the Fallsway Impound Facility in Penn-Fallsway as a site to which vehicles are towed for parking enforcement.

=== Utilities ===
Baltimore Gas & Electric operates its Front Street Complex in Penn-Fallsway, in between Monument Street and Hillen Street.

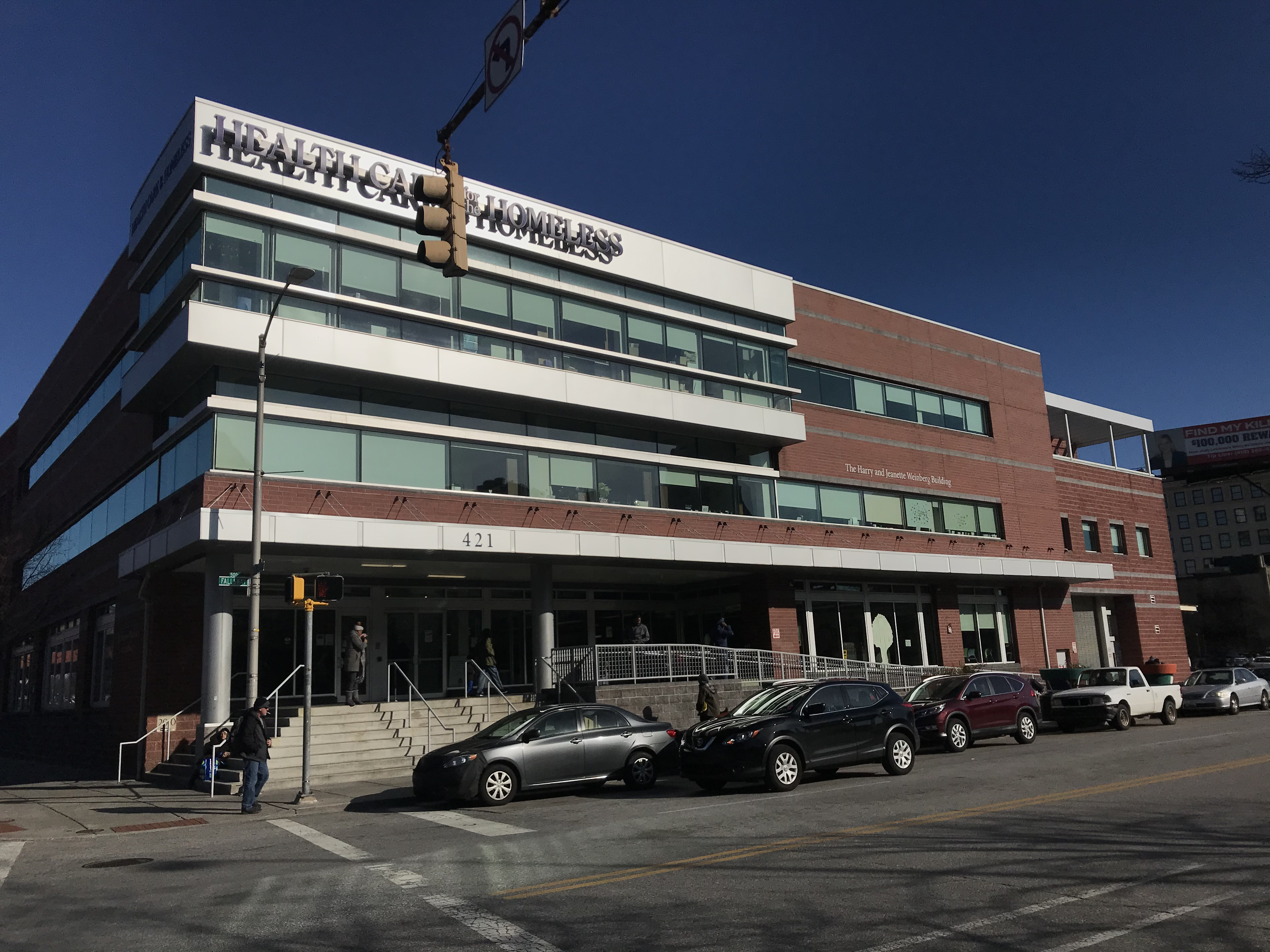
Healthcare for the Homeless building, 421 Fallsway

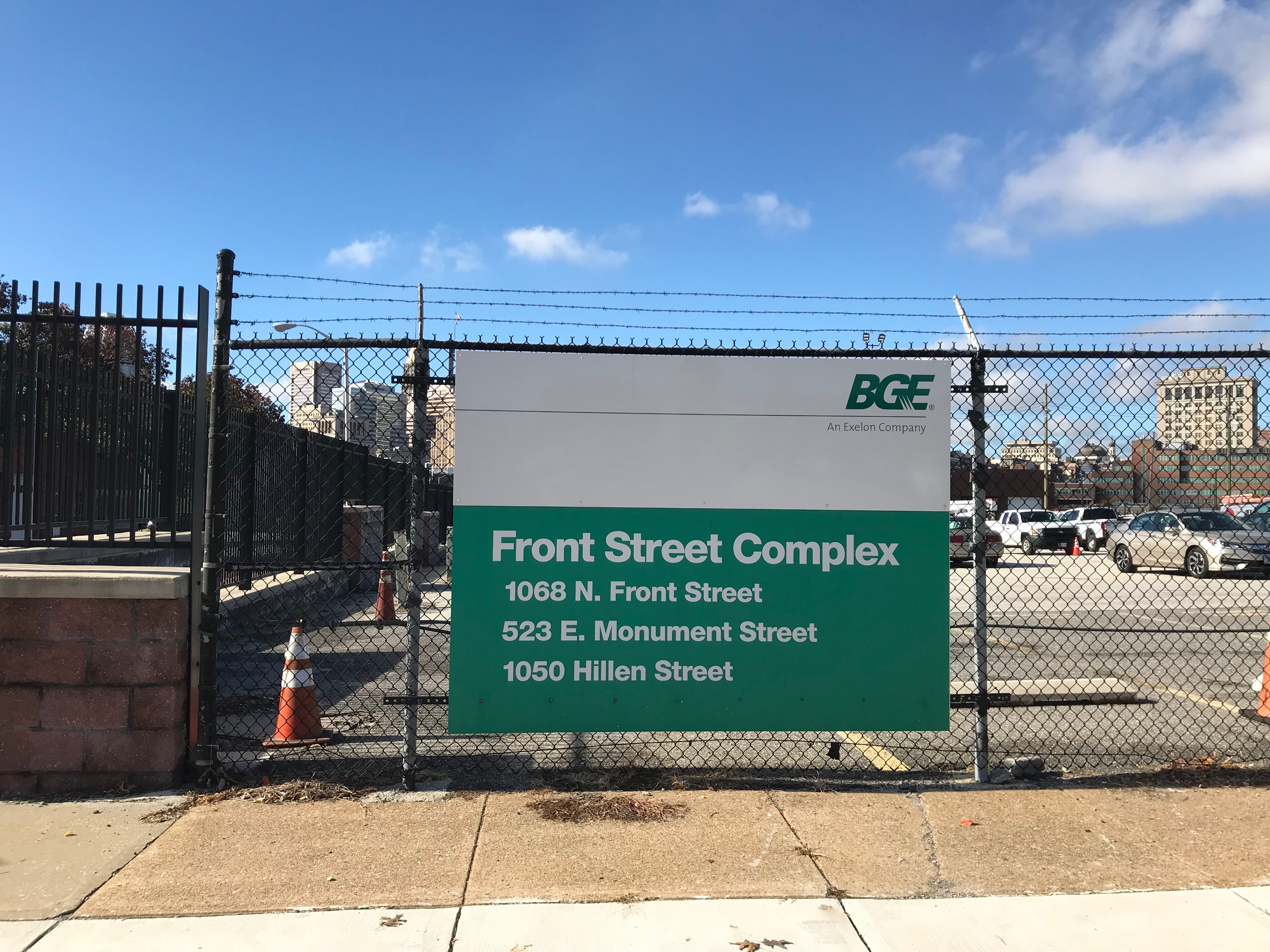
BGE Front Street Complex, 1068 North Front Street / 523 East Monument Street / 1050 Hillen Street

== Education ==
Eager Street Academy, a public alternative middle-high school which serves incarcerated youth charged as adults operates within the Baltimore Juvenile Justice Center, a detention center built in 2017 on Greenmount Avenue as a separate facility for youth who were formerly held at the Baltimore City Detention Center with adults. The detention facility has had many public critics and opponents; protests were held upon its opening and critics advocated for state funds to be spent on youth services such as recreation centers instead.

== Commercial buildings ==
Club Atlantis was a burlesque house and gay strip club located on Fallsway which closed in 2004. The club was featured in John Waters's 1998 film Pecker as a gay bar called the Fudge Palace. A strip club opened at the site in 2006 which was called Scores until 2018, when its name was changed to The Penthouse Club. The Penthouse Club was the subject of media attention during the COVID-19 pandemic when it filed a lawsuit in March 2021 against the Mayor Brandon Scott and Baltimore City Council, contending that a ban on adult entertainment implemented by the city was an infringement on the right to free speech.

A Public Storage facility operates in a building on Hillen Street just beyond the Orleans Street Viaduct which is the one surviving structure from the former Western Maryland Railway's Hillen Terminal.

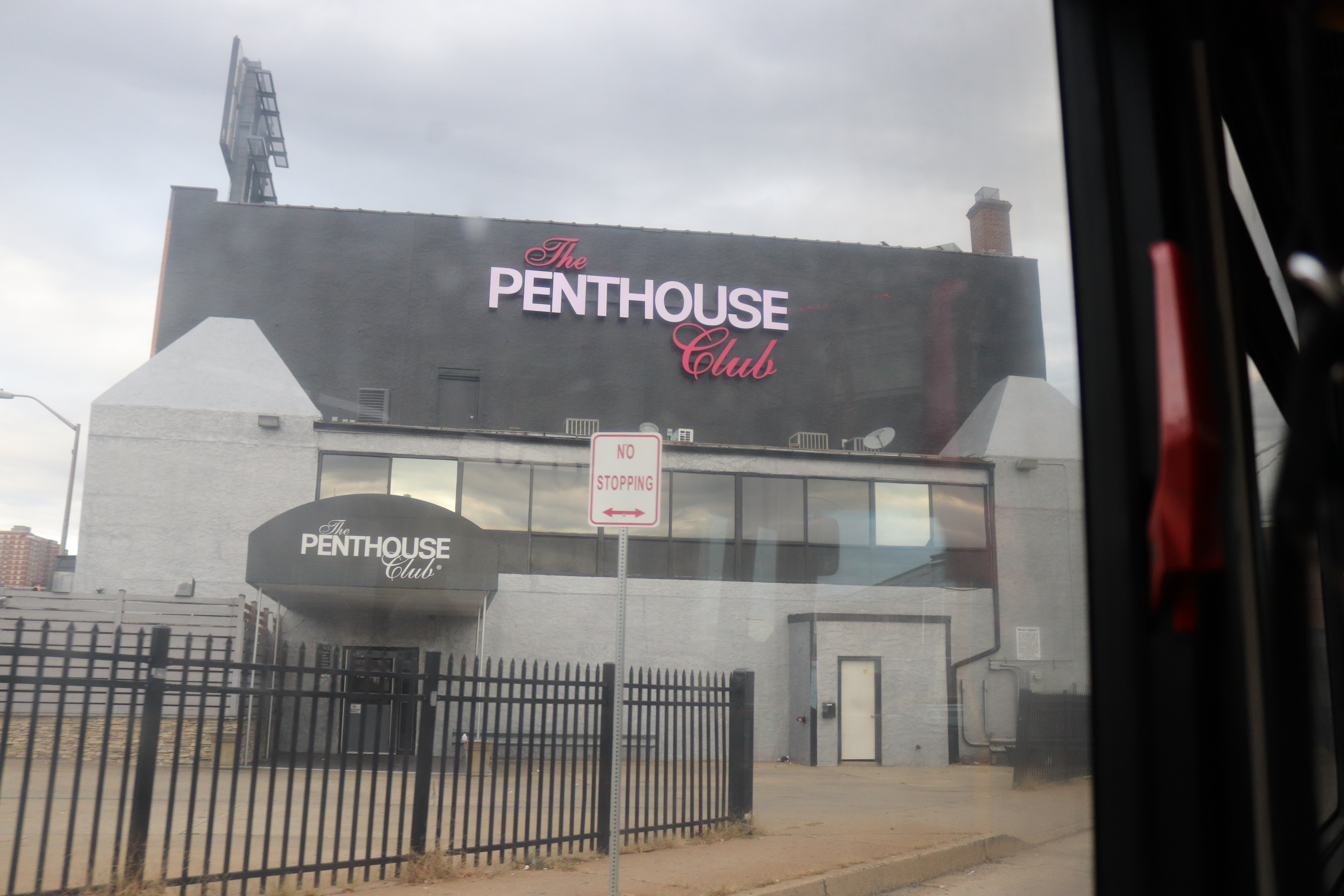
Penthouse Club, 615 Fallsway

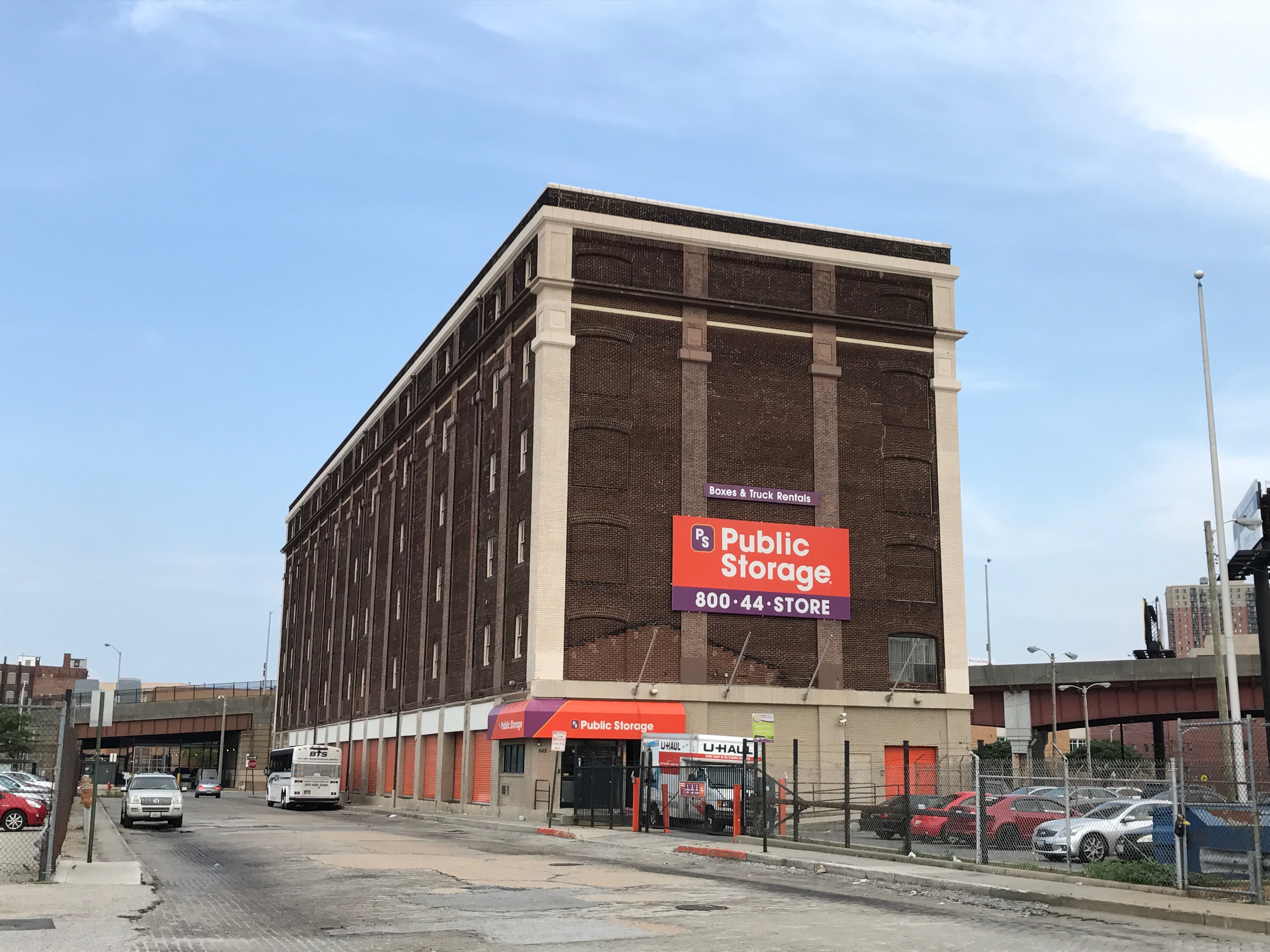
Public Storage Building, 842 Hillen Street
