= Spendthrift Farm =

Thoroughbred horse farm

Coordinates: 38.109107°N 84.427595°W

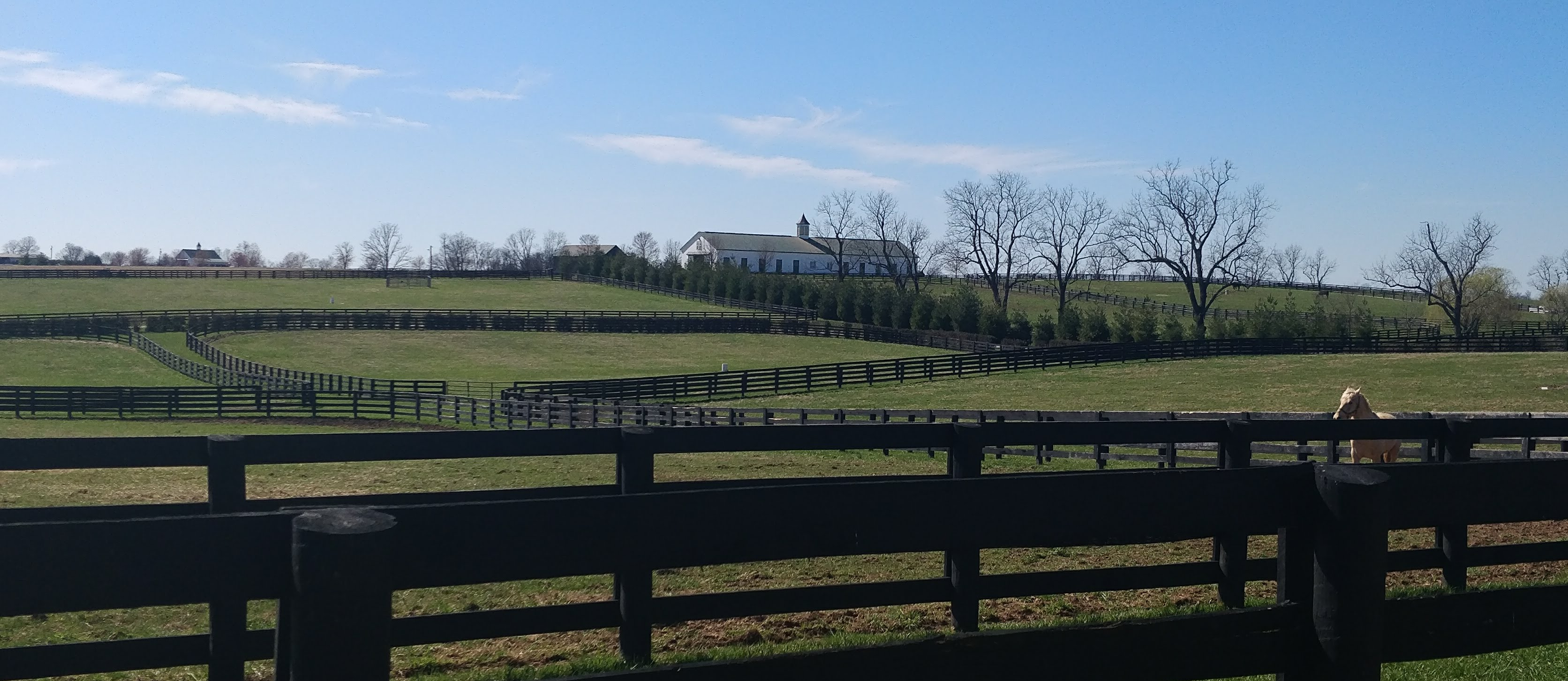
- Type: Horse breeding stud farm and Thoroughbred racing stable
- Industry: Thoroughbred horse racing
- Headquarters: 884 Iron Works Pike, Lexington, Kentucky
- Key people: Leslie Combs II (founding owner); B. Wayne Hughes (owner, 2004–2021); Eric & Tammy Gustavson (current owner)
- Website: http://spendthriftfarm.com/

Spendthrift Farm is a thoroughbred race horse breeding farm and burial site in Lexington, Kentucky, currently owned by Eric & Tammy Gustavson. It was founded in 1937 by Leslie Combs II and named for the great stallion Spendthrift, who was owned by Combs' ancestor, Daniel Swigert of Elmendorf Farm. Spendthrift was the great-grandfather of Man o' War.

Although Spendthrift Farm is known mostly as a commercial breeding operation, they maintain a small racing stable as well. Their most notable runners are Beholder, a four-time Eclipse Award winning mare; Lord Nelson, a three-time Grade I winning sprinter; Court Vision, who won the Breeders' Cup Mile; and Tamara, a Grade 1 winning daughter of Beholder and Bolt d'Oro.

== History ==
Racing silks of Spendthrift Farm

In 1966, Majestic Prince was foaled at Spendthrift, bred by Combs. The famous son of Raise A Native later was returned to the farms and died there in 1981. In 1979, the great Triple Crown winner Seattle Slew was retired to stud and stood at Spendthrift until 1987.

Spendthrift Farms went public in 1983. In 1984, Queen Elizabeth II visited Spendthrift Farms to view not only Seattle Slew but also Affirmed as possible studs for her stable of Thoroughbreds containing 22 broodmares.

In 1984, the Keeneland Association honored Spendthrift Farm with its Mark of Distinction for their contribution to Keeneland and the Thoroughbred industry.

In 1988, Spendthrift Farms filed for bankruptcy. The farm was acquired out of bankruptcy the next year by Terry McBrayer, Curtis C. Green, Henry "Cap" Hershey, and William du Pont III.

Spendthrift Farms was sold in a foreclosure auction to MetLife in 1993. MetLife resold it to lawyer Ted Taylor the next year.

Spendthrift Farm is also known for having been a respondent in a landmark case about separation of powers. In Plaut v. Spendthrift Farm, Inc., 514 U.S. 211 (1995), the Supreme Court of the United States held that federal courts cannot be legally required by Congress to reconsider final judgments in previously adjudicated cases. It was a 7-2 ruling with six justices in the majority with one writing a concurring opinion and two in a dissenting opinion. The majority opinion was written by Associate Justice Antonin Scalia.

In 2000, the farm was acquired by Bruce Klein. In 2004, B. Wayne Hughes, the founder of Public Storage, purchased the historic farm.

In 2020, as part of an ownership group with MyRaceHorse Stable, Madaket Stables, and Starlight Racing, Spendthrift was named the leading owner for North American earnings due to a successful season for Authentic.

== Burial site ==
Along with being a breeding facility in the 1960s and 70's, several important racehorses are buried at the farm. These include, Nashua, Never Bend, Prince John, Raise A Native, Gallant Man, Caro, Majestic Prince, and Valdez.

== Stallion roster ==
Their 2026 stallion roster and their stud fees are:

- Arabian Lion — $15,000
- Authentic — $15,000
- Basin — $5,000
- By My Standards — $5,000
- Bolt d'Oro — $25,000
- Chancer McPatrick - $25,000
- Cyberknife — $15,000
- Dornoch - $30,000
- Forte — $35,000
- Goldencents — $10,000
- Goal Oriented - $30,000
- Greatest Honor — $7,500
- Into Mischief — $250,000
- Jackie's Warrior — $25,000
- Jimmy Creed — $7,500
- Kingsbarns - $12,500
- Known Agenda — $5,000
- Maximus Mischief — $20,000
- Mitole — $10,000
- Mo Donegal — $5,000
- National Treasure - $35,000
- Omaha Beach — $75,000
- Rock Your World — $7,500
- Taiba — $25,000
- Temple City — PRIVATE
- Thousand Words — $7,500
- Vekoma — $100,000
- Vino Rosso — $7,500
- Yaupon — $60,000
- Zandon — $7,500
