= Pretium Partners =

American real estate and credit investment firm

Pretium Partners, LLC
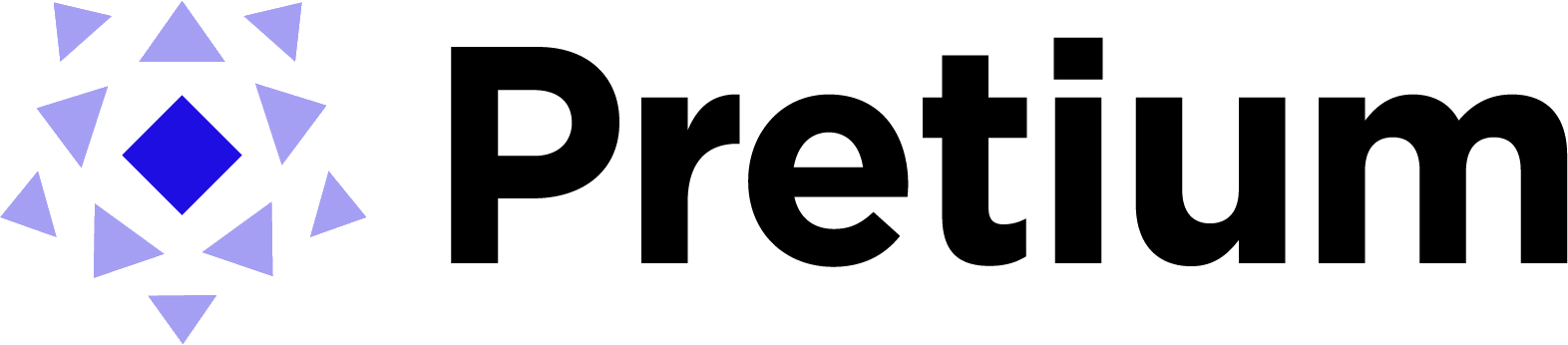
- Type: Private
- Industry: Investment management
- Founded: 2012; 14 years ago
- Founder: Don Mullen
- Headquarters: New York City, U.S.
- Key people: Jonathan Pruzan; Stephen Scherr
- Products: Alternative investments Private equity real estate Private credit
- AUM: US$70 billion (June 30, 2026)
- Subsidiaries: Anchor Loans; Deephaven Mortgage; HavenBrook Homes; Progress Residential; Selene Finance LP
- Website: pretium.com

Pretium Partners, LLC (Pretium) is an American alternative investment firm headquartered in New York City. The firm focuses on investments in residential real estate as well as Corporate and Structured Credit.

In 2022, the firm was ranked by PERE (under Private Equity International) as the fifteenth largest private equity real estate firm based on total fundraising over the most recent five-year period.

It is stated to have a portfolio of 85,000 homes as of late 2022 making it the second largest owner of single-family rental homes in the United States behind Invitation Homes.

The firm has attracted controversy for its strategy of buying up large number of homes then charging tenants with high rental fees while providing poor maintenance. It has also been accused of evicting tenants who cannot pay rent during the COVID-19 pandemic despite COVID-19 eviction moratoriums being placed by the Centers for Disease Control and Prevention (CDC).

== Background ==
Pretium was formed in 2012 by Donald Mullen who was a Partner at Goldman Sachs. Mullen was the head of Goldman Sachs’ mortgage and credit business and was one of the main architects behind the bet against the U.S. housing market in what became known as "The Big Short." The bet paid off and produced lucrative returns for Goldman Sachs after the Subprime mortgage crisis which caused the 2000s United States housing market correction.

In 2012, Pretium raised $1.2 billion for its first residential real estate fund named Progress Residential, L.P which was used to buy more than 16,500 homes at big discounts. The fund would fund the establishment of the company Progress Residential, which acts as a single-family rental (SFR) management services platform.

In 2014, Pretium raised $900 million for its second fund to purchase roughly 14,000 non-performing home loans.

In 2016, Pretium raised $1 billion for its third fund to buy single-family homes to rent out to tenants.

In October 2018, Pretium announced it would acquire mortgage loan servicing company Selene Finance LLP from Oaktree Capital Management and Ranieri Partners.

In 2019, Pretium raised $2.5 billion in another fund for its single-family rental business with Landmark Partners partially funding it. In the same year, Pretium acquired non-qualified mortgage, Deephaven Mortgage from Värde Partners.

In February 2020, Pretium acquired the investment management business of Latigo, fund manager that specialises in event-driven investing opportunities.

In January 2021, Pretium and Ares Management took NYSE listed landlord company, Front Yard Residential private for $2.5 billion. HavenBrook Homes which was part of Front Yard Residential also came under the control of Pretium. During the same month, Pretium and the Public Sector Pension Investment Board formed a $700 million joint venture to invest the retirement savings of most federal employees, to develop SFR housing in the U.S.

In September 2021, Pretium and Crescent Communities set up a $1 billion joint venture to construct new homes that are built to rent.

In November 2021, Pretium acquired home-flipping lender Anchor Loans for $1.5 billion.

In January 2022, Pretium and Indianapolis-based builder Onyx+East formed a $600 million joint venture to develop rental homes.

In December 2022, Pretium opened a new office in Miami Beach.

In 2022, Progress Residential acquired approximately 3,300 homes from Zillow Group's Zillow Offers business, making Pretium one of the largest institutional buyers of Zillow's single-family home portfolio.

In 2023, Pretium paid $1.5 billion to D.R. Horton for 4,000 rental homes. In September of that year, Jonathan Pruzan, previously the chief operating officer at Morgan Stanley, was appointed president.

In October 2024, Stephen Scherr was named co-president. Also in 2024, Pretium acquired BH Management Services.

In 2025, Pretium launched a homebuilder lending strategy to fill a financing gap left by regional banks. They also expanded their insurance solutions business, partnering with insurance companies and providing access to customized private credit assets, and launched a third residential credit fund.

== Controversies ==
=== Washington Post coverage ===
On December 15, 2021, The Washington Post profiled the Pretium in an article after its business plans and investors were revealed in the Pandora Papers.The plan sought to exploit the 2000s United States housing market correction that forced millions of homeowners into foreclosure leading to many cheap houses for sale. Pretium planned to acquire these houses and rent them to families who had lost their homes or could no longer qualify for a mortgage. Pretium send confidential invitations to investors who could contribute $2 million. According to its solicitation documents in 2012, the plan was projected to have annualized returns of 15 to 20 percent. Pretium raised more than $1 billion which allowed it to form Progress Residential. Notable investors include Charles and Stephen Bronfman of the Bronfman family and Vikrant Bhargava. According to tax experts, Pretium made legal arrangements so such foreign investors would have limited exposure to U.S. taxes. However Pretium has stated its tax arrangement structured and managed in accordance with industry best practices. By 2019, according to Pretium's press release, its Progress Residential venture had nearly doubled investors' equity. Progress Residential has been stated to acquire as many as 2,000 houses a month using a computerized property-search algorithm and rapid all-cash offers.

The article also covered how families in Tammy Sue Lane in La Vergne, Tennessee, complained about how Progress Residential bought up most residential property and were treating occupants unfairly, providing poor maintenance and charging excessive rent fees. As housing prices were too high, they had no choice but to rent the houses under Progress Residential. Progress Residential has stated its fees adhere to basic industry standards. Complaints drew little attention until the COVID-19 pandemic where residents were evicted from their house if they were unable to pay rent despite the economic conditions and the COVID-19 eviction moratoriums issued by the CDC. Pretium has stated that no resident covered by a signed CDC declaration affirming their inability to pay their full rent has ever been evicted.

=== State lawsuit ===
In early 2022, Minnesota Attorney General Keith Ellison sued HavenBrook Homes and its owner, Pretium for failing to maintain its properties and violating the statewide pandemic eviction moratorium.
