= B. Wayne Hughes Jr. =

American businessman and philanthropist

- Born: Bradley Wayne Hughes Jr. 1958 or 1959 (age 66–67)
- Education: University of Southern California
- Occupation: Businessman
- Children: 2
- Father: B. Wayne Hughes
- Relatives: Tamara Gustavson (sister)

B. Wayne Hughes Jr. (born 1958 or 1959) is an American businessman and philanthropist. He is the son and namesake of B. Wayne Hughes, the founder and chairman of Public Storage, established in 1972.

== Business background ==
Hughes Jr. held a leading role in the family business from 1985 to 1998 as Vice President of Acquisitions. Public Storage operates storage facilities across the United States and Europe as a member of the S&P 500 and FT Global 500. At present (2016), he is a member of the Board of Trustees of Public Storage, alongside his sister Tamara Gustavson.

In 2005, Hughes Jr. founded American Commercial Equities. The firm is based in Malibu, California, and focuses on the management and acquisition of prime real estate properties in California and Hawaii. According to Forbes, Hughes Jr.'s estimated net worth is $2 billion (as of March 2024).

== Personal life ==
Hughes Jr. holds a Bachelor of Arts in Performing Arts from the University of Southern California. A native of Southern California, he is a surfer and rancher. Hughes Jr. has two children.

== Philanthropy ==
Hughes Jr. played a significant role in the foundation of Oaks Christian School in California.

In 2013, Hughes Jr. established Serving California. The mission of the foundation is to aid victims of crime and hardship, rehabilitate ex-offenders, and assist veterans impacted by PTSD.

== Political activities ==
Hughes Jr. donated $1.2 million to California Proposition 47 (2014), focused on sentencing reform, which California voters passed in November 2014. The bill reduces certain drug possession felonies to misdemeanors. During the campaign he stated, "When [Prop 47] passes ... the next place for parties to come together are issues around mental health. I'm doing what I'm doing and I'm not going to quit. It's fun helping people."

Hughes Jr. supported CA Assembly Bill 1672, which works to expand the reach of veterans courts dealing with rehabilitation and recovery.

Hughes Jr. is a member of the organization Right on Crime, a nationwide initiative to drive criminal justice reform. On June 15, 2014, Hughes Jr. spoke at TEDx at Ironwood State Prison about the need for change in the country's prison system.

During the 2016 presidential election, Hughes Jr. donated $117,000 to the campaign of Libertarian Gary Johnson.

Hughes Jr. contributed $500,000 to Donald Trump's 2020 presidential campaign.
