= 2013 5-hour Energy 200 (June) =

11th race of the 2013 NASCAR Nationwide Series

Race details
- Race 11 of 33 of the 2013 NASCAR Nationwide Series
- Date: June 1, 2013
- Official name: 32nd Annual 5-hour Energy 200
- Location: Dover, Delaware, Dover International Speedway
- Course: Permanent racing facility
- Course length: 1 miles (1.6 km)
- Distance: 200 laps, 200 mi (321.868 km)
- Scheduled distance: 200 laps, 200 mi (321.868 km)
- Average speed: 111.145 miles per hour (178.871 km/h)

Pole position
Driver	Austin Dillon	Richard Childress Racing
- Time: 23.537

Most laps led
Driver	Kyle Busch	Joe Gibbs Racing
- Laps: 72

Winner
No. 22	Joey Logano	Penske Racing

Television in the United States
- Network: ESPN
- Announcers: Allen Bestwick, Dale Jarrett, Andy Petree

Radio in the United States
- Radio: Motor Racing Network

The 2013 5-hour Energy 200 was the 11th stock car race of the 2013 NASCAR Nationwide Series and the 32nd iteration of the event. The race was held on Saturday, June 1, 2013, in Dover, Delaware at Dover International Speedway, a 1 mile (1.6 km) permanent oval-shaped racetrack. The race took the scheduled 200 laps to complete. At race's end, Joey Logano, driving for Penske Racing, erased a five-second deficit with pit strategy and would go on to win his 19th career NASCAR Nationwide Series win and his first of the season. To fill out the podium, Brian Vickers and Matt Kenseth of Joe Gibbs Racing would finish second and third, respectively.

== Background ==
The layout of Dover International Speedway, the venue where the race was held.

Dover International Speedway is an oval race track in Dover, Delaware, United States that has held at least two NASCAR races since it opened in 1969. In addition to NASCAR, the track also hosted USAC and the NTT IndyCar Series. The track features one layout, a 1-mile (1.6 km) concrete oval, with 24° banking in the turns and 9° banking on the straights. The speedway is owned and operated by Dover Motorsports.

The track, nicknamed "The Monster Mile", was built in 1969 by Melvin Joseph of Melvin L. Joseph Construction Company, Inc., with an asphalt surface, but was replaced with concrete in 1995. Six years later in 2001, the track's capacity moved to 135,000 seats, making the track have the largest capacity of sports venue in the mid-Atlantic. In 2002, the name changed to Dover International Speedway from Dover Downs International Speedway after Dover Downs Gaming and Entertainment split, making Dover Motorsports. From 2007 to 2009, the speedway worked on an improvement project called "The Monster Makeover", which expanded facilities at the track and beautified the track. After the 2014 season, the track's capacity was reduced to 95,500 seats.

=== Entry list ===
#	Driver	Team	Make	Sponsor
00	Blake Koch	SR² Motorsports	Toyota	Support Military
01	Mike Wallace	JD Motorsports	Chevrolet	Iron Source, Meding's Seafood
2	Brian Scott	Richard Childress Racing	Chevrolet	Shore Lodge
3	Austin Dillon	Richard Childress Racing	Chevrolet	AdvoCare
4	Landon Cassill	JD Motorsports	Chevrolet	Flex Seal
5	Kasey Kahne	JR Motorsports	Chevrolet	Great Clips
6	Trevor Bayne	Roush Fenway Racing	Ford	Ford EcoBoost
7	Regan Smith	JR Motorsports	Chevrolet	TaxSlayer
10	Jeff Green	TriStar Motorsports	Toyota	TriStar Motorsports
11	Elliott Sadler	Joe Gibbs Racing	Toyota	OneMain Financial
12	Sam Hornish Jr.	Penske Racing	Ford	Würth
14	Eric McClure	TriStar Motorsports	Toyota	Hefty, Reynolds Wrap
18	Matt Kenseth	Joe Gibbs Racing	Toyota	GameStop, Grid 2
19	Mike Bliss	TriStar Motorsports	Toyota	MTM Technologies
20	Brian Vickers	Joe Gibbs Racing	Toyota	Dollar General
22	Joey Logano	Penske Racing	Ford	Hertz
23	Harrison Rhodes	Rick Ware Racing	Ford	Chick-fil-A
24	Jason White	SR² Motorsports	Toyota	JW Demolition
30	Nelson Piquet Jr.	Turner Scott Motorsports	Chevrolet	Worx Yard Tools
31	Justin Allgaier	Turner Scott Motorsports	Chevrolet	Brandt Professional Agriculture
32	Kyle Larson	Turner Scott Motorsports	Chevrolet	Hulu Plus, Vizio
33	Ty Dillon	Richard Childress Racing	Chevrolet	WESCO
37	Matt DiBenedetto	Vision Racing	Dodge	National Cash Lenders
40	Reed Sorenson	The Motorsports Group	Chevrolet	Swisher E-Cigarette
42	Josh Wise	The Motorsports Group	Chevrolet	The Motorsports Group
43	Michael Annett	Richard Petty Motorsports	Ford	Pilot Flying J
44	Cole Whitt	TriStar Motorsports	Toyota	TriStar Motorsports
46	J. J. Yeley	The Motorsports Group	Chevrolet	The Motorsports Group
51	Jeremy Clements	Jeremy Clements Racing	Chevrolet	RepairableVehicles.com
52	Joey Gase	Jimmy Means Racing	Toyota	Donate Life
54	Kyle Busch	Joe Gibbs Racing	Toyota	Monster Energy
60	Travis Pastrana	Roush Fenway Racing	Ford	Roush Fenway Racing
70	Tony Raines	ML Motorsports	Toyota	ML Motorsports
74	Danny Efland	Mike Harmon Racing	Chevrolet	Mike Harmon Racing
77	Parker Kligerman	Kyle Busch Motorsports	Toyota	All Metal Fabricators, Toyota
79	Jeffrey Earnhardt	Go Green Racing	Ford	Oath Keepers "We The People"
87	Joe Nemechek	NEMCO Motorsports	Toyota	Herbal Mist Tea
89	Morgan Shepherd	Shepherd Racing Ventures	Chevrolet	Racing with Jesus "Crank It Up" Campaign
92	Dexter Stacey	KH Motorsports	Ford	Maddie's Place Rocks
99	Alex Bowman	RAB Racing	Toyota	SchoolTipline, St. Jude Children's Research Hospital
Official entry list

== Practice ==
The only practice session was held on Friday, May 31, at 12:40 AM EST, and would last for two hours and 20 minutes. Austin Dillon of Richard Childress Racing would set the fastest time in the session, with a lap of 23.617 and an average speed of 152.433 miles per hour (245.317 km/h).

Pos.	#	Driver	Team	Make	Time	Speed
1	3	Austin Dillon	Richard Childress Racing	Chevrolet	23.617	152.433
2	99	Alex Bowman	RAB Racing	Toyota	23.793	151.305
3	20	Brian Vickers	Joe Gibbs Racing	Toyota	23.794	151.299
Full practice results

== Qualifying ==
Qualifying was held on Saturday, June 1, at 11:05 AM EST. Each driver would have two laps to set a fastest time; the fastest of the two would count as their official qualifying lap.

Austin Dillon of Richard Childress Racing would win the pole, setting a time of 23.537 and an average speed of 152.951 miles per hour (246.151 km/h).

No drivers would fail to qualify.

=== Full qualifying results ===
Pos.	#	Driver	Team	Make	Time	Speed
1	3	Austin Dillon	Richard Childress Racing	Chevrolet	23.537	152.951
2	12	Sam Hornish Jr.	Penske Racing	Ford	23.554	152.840
3	54	Kyle Busch	Joe Gibbs Racing	Toyota	23.567	152.756
4	99	Alex Bowman	RAB Racing	Toyota	23.573	152.717
5	5	Kasey Kahne	JR Motorsports	Chevrolet	23.645	152.252
6	22	Joey Logano	Penske Racing	Ford	23.655	152.188
7	7	Regan Smith	JR Motorsports	Chevrolet	23.677	152.046
8	33	Ty Dillon	Richard Childress Racing	Chevrolet	23.715	151.803
9	18	Matt Kenseth	Joe Gibbs Racing	Toyota	23.744	151.617
10	2	Brian Scott	Richard Childress Racing	Chevrolet	23.767	151.471
11	20	Brian Vickers	Joe Gibbs Racing	Toyota	23.779	151.394
12	6	Trevor Bayne	Roush Fenway Racing	Ford	23.782	151.375
13	31	Justin Allgaier	Turner Scott Motorsports	Chevrolet	23.812	151.184
14	77	Parker Kligerman	Kyle Busch Motorsports	Toyota	23.856	150.905
15	32	Kyle Larson	Turner Scott Motorsports	Chevrolet	23.888	150.703
16	60	Travis Pastrana	Roush Fenway Racing	Ford	23.956	150.276
17	19	Mike Bliss	TriStar Motorsports	Toyota	23.995	150.031
18	11	Elliott Sadler	Joe Gibbs Racing	Toyota	24.052	149.676
19	43	Michael Annett	Richard Petty Motorsports	Ford	24.117	149.272
20	44	Cole Whitt	TriStar Motorsports	Toyota	24.178	148.896
21	51	Jeremy Clements	Jeremy Clements Racing	Chevrolet	24.215	148.668
22	30	Nelson Piquet Jr.	Turner Scott Motorsports	Chevrolet	24.256	148.417
23	42	Josh Wise	The Motorsports Group	Chevrolet	24.364	147.759
24	01	Mike Wallace	JD Motorsports	Chevrolet	24.381	147.656
25	40	Reed Sorenson	The Motorsports Group	Chevrolet	24.389	147.608
26	87	Joe Nemechek	NEMCO Motorsports	Toyota	24.438	147.312
27	92	Dexter Stacey	KH Motorsports	Ford	24.466	147.143
28	46	J. J. Yeley	The Motorsports Group	Chevrolet	24.568	146.532
29	10	Jeff Green	TriStar Motorsports	Toyota	24.587	146.419
30	4	Landon Cassill	JD Motorsports	Chevrolet	24.615	146.252
31	37	Matt DiBenedetto	Vision Racing	Dodge	24.645	146.074
32	14	Eric McClure	TriStar Motorsports	Toyota	24.692	145.796
33	79	Jeffrey Earnhardt	Go Green Racing	Ford	24.704	145.725
34	23	Harrison Rhodes	Rick Ware Racing	Ford	24.796	145.185
35	52	Joey Gase	Jimmy Means Racing	Toyota	24.822	145.033
36	74	Danny Efland	Mike Harmon Racing	Chevrolet	24.853	144.852
37	24	Jason White	SR² Motorsports	Toyota	25.124	143.289
38	89	Morgan Shepherd	Shepherd Racing Ventures	Chevrolet	25.911	138.937
39	00	Blake Koch	SR² Motorsports	Toyota	26.209	137.357
40	70	Tony Raines	ML Motorsports	Toyota	31.045	115.961
Official starting lineup

== Race results ==
Fin	St	#	Driver	Team	Make	Laps	Led	Status	Pts	Winnings
1	6	22	Joey Logano	Penske Racing	Ford	200	66	running	0	$43,630
2	11	20	Brian Vickers	Joe Gibbs Racing	Toyota	200	0	running	42	$38,190
3	9	18	Matt Kenseth	Joe Gibbs Racing	Toyota	200	0	running	0	$23,565
4	12	6	Trevor Bayne	Roush Fenway Racing	Ford	200	5	running	41	$27,490
5	3	54	Kyle Busch	Joe Gibbs Racing	Toyota	200	72	running	0	$22,715
6	5	5	Kasey Kahne	JR Motorsports	Chevrolet	200	14	running	0	$17,465
7	2	12	Sam Hornish Jr.	Penske Racing	Ford	200	0	running	37	$22,050
8	1	3	Austin Dillon	Richard Childress Racing	Chevrolet	200	43	running	37	$27,210
9	7	7	Regan Smith	JR Motorsports	Chevrolet	200	0	running	35	$21,415
10	15	32	Kyle Larson	Turner Scott Motorsports	Chevrolet	200	0	running	34	$23,240
11	14	77	Parker Kligerman	Kyle Busch Motorsports	Toyota	200	0	running	33	$20,765
12	13	31	Justin Allgaier	Turner Scott Motorsports	Chevrolet	200	0	running	32	$20,640
13	19	43	Michael Annett	Richard Petty Motorsports	Ford	200	0	running	31	$20,540
14	10	2	Brian Scott	Richard Childress Racing	Chevrolet	200	0	running	30	$20,415
15	16	60	Travis Pastrana	Roush Fenway Racing	Ford	200	0	running	29	$21,515
16	20	44	Cole Whitt	TriStar Motorsports	Toyota	200	0	running	28	$20,265
17	4	99	Alex Bowman	RAB Racing	Toyota	200	0	running	27	$20,190
18	17	19	Mike Bliss	TriStar Motorsports	Toyota	200	0	running	26	$20,140
19	21	51	Jeremy Clements	Jeremy Clements Racing	Chevrolet	200	0	running	25	$20,090
20	22	30	Nelson Piquet Jr.	Turner Scott Motorsports	Chevrolet	200	0	running	24	$20,715
21	33	79	Jeffrey Earnhardt	Go Green Racing	Ford	199	0	running	23	$19,985
22	30	4	Landon Cassill	JD Motorsports	Chevrolet	198	0	running	22	$19,885
23	8	33	Ty Dillon	Richard Childress Racing	Chevrolet	198	0	running	0	$19,810
24	32	14	Eric McClure	TriStar Motorsports	Toyota	195	0	running	20	$19,760
25	27	92	Dexter Stacey	KH Motorsports	Ford	195	0	running	19	$20,185
26	34	23	Harrison Rhodes	Rick Ware Racing	Ford	195	0	running	18	$19,660
27	36	74	Danny Efland	Mike Harmon Racing	Chevrolet	192	0	running	17	$19,610
28	18	11	Elliott Sadler	Joe Gibbs Racing	Toyota	191	0	running	16	$20,535
29	25	40	Reed Sorenson	The Motorsports Group	Chevrolet	190	0	running	15	$19,460
30	40	70	Tony Raines	ML Motorsports	Toyota	111	0	fuel pump	14	$19,710
31	24	01	Mike Wallace	JD Motorsports	Chevrolet	109	0	crash	13	$19,360
32	37	24	Jason White	SR² Motorsports	Toyota	62	0	engine	12	$19,315
33	26	87	Joe Nemechek	NEMCO Motorsports	Toyota	43	0	crash	11	$19,245
34	35	52	Joey Gase	Jimmy Means Racing	Toyota	33	0	electrical	10	$19,200
35	29	10	Jeff Green	TriStar Motorsports	Toyota	18	0	vibration	9	$13,155
36	38	89	Morgan Shepherd	Shepherd Racing Ventures	Chevrolet	14	0	engine	8	$12,260
37	28	46	J. J. Yeley	The Motorsports Group	Chevrolet	11	0	overheating	0	$12,240
38	23	42	Josh Wise	The Motorsports Group	Chevrolet	9	0	electrical	6	$12,176
39	31	37	Matt DiBenedetto	Vision Racing	Dodge	6	0	handling	0	$12,075
40	39	00	Blake Koch	SR² Motorsports	Toyota	4	0	brakes	4	$12,020
Official race results

Previous race: 2013 History 300	NASCAR Nationwide Series; 2013 season	Next race: 2013 DuPont Pioneer 250
