= Life Storage =

Real estate investment trust headquartered in Williamsville, NY

Life Storage, Inc.
- Formerly: Sovran Self Storage (1982–2016)
- Type: Defunct
- Industry: Real estate investment trust
- Founded: 1982; 44 years ago (as Sovran Self Storage)
- Defunct: July 20, 2023; 2 years ago
- Headquarters: United States
- Products: Self storage

Life Storage, Inc. (formerly Sovran Self Storage and Uncle Bob's Self Storage) was a real estate investment trust headquartered in Williamsville, New York, that invested in self storage units. In July 2023, the company was acquired by Extra Space Storage.

== History ==
The company was founded as a financial planning firm in Buffalo, New York in 1982. In 1985, the company entered the self-storage industry by opening its first facility in Florida, accumulating around 30 facilities along the East Coast of the United States over the next three years.

During the next decade, the company acquired 62 self-storage facilities in the United States, and rebranded each one to "Uncle Bob's Self Storage" under the leadership of former CEO and Executive Chairman, Robert J. Attea. In 1995, the company became a public company through an initial public offering. By the end of 1996, the company operated 111 self-storage facilities in 15 states along the East Coast and Texas. It grew to 222 facilities by 1999, all of which used "Uncle Bob's" name. Five years later, the company operated facilities in 21 states.

In 2012, David Rogers, the former CFO, was appointed CEO, replacing Robert J. Attea, who remained Executive Chairman. As of November 2013, the company operated 471 facilities in 25 states.

In July 2016, the company acquired Life Storage LP for $1.3 billion, giving it its first properties in Northern California and Las Vegas.

In August 2016, the company rebranded its facilities from "Uncle Bob's Self Storage" to "Life Storage" and changed its name.

In 2019, Joseph Saffire replaced David Rogers as the CEO of the company.

In December 2021, the company formed a joint venture with Heitman LLC to invest in self storage properties.

In July 2023, the company was acquired by Extra Space Storage for $12.7 billion after it outbid an $11 billion offer from Public Storage.

=== Small property acquisitions ===
In 2014, the company made 2 small portfolio acquisitions.

In 2016 and 2017, the company acquired properties in Wisconsin, Arizona, Nevada, and Tennessee.

In 2019, the company acquired a property in Tampa and sold properties in Greensboro, North Carolina.
