= Eager Street Academy =

Alternative middle-high school in Baltimore, MD, USA

Location
- 926 Greenmount Avenue; Baltimore, Maryland 21202; United States; 39°18′3.17″N 76°36′26.72″W

Information
- School type: Public, Alternative
- Founded: 1998
- School district: Baltimore City Public Schools
- School number: 884
- Principal: Laura D'Anna
- Grades: 6–12
- Enrollment: Variable
- Area: Urban
- Website: BCPSS

Eager Street Academy (previously Baltimore City Detention Center, School No. 370) is a public, alternative middle-high school serving youth who are incarcerated, located in the Penn-Fallsway neighborhood of Baltimore, Maryland, United States. The school was launched in 1998 as a collaboration between Baltimore City Public Schools (BCPSS), Maryland State Department of Education and the state's Division of Pretrial Detention and Services, and is a part of the larger city school system. Initially without an official name beyond its numeric designation, the school was given the name "Eager Street Academy" in 2002.

Based inside the Baltimore City Detention Center, an adult detention facility, Eager Street serves students under 18 who have been charged as adults. BCPSS officials have claimed the school is the only public school in the United States located inside of a jail. Classes at the school were initially held in six portable trailers on the grounds of the BCDC, but its classrooms are now located within a purpose-built juvenile detention facility built in 2017.
