= American Homes 4 Rent =

American real estate investment firm

American Homes 4 Rent [AMH]
- Company type: Public company
- Traded as: NYSE: AMH (Class A); S&P 400 component
- Industry: Real estate investment trust
- Founded: October 19, 2012; 13 years ago
- Founder: B. Wayne Hughes
- Headquarters: Las Vegas, Nevada, U.S.
- Key people: Bryan Smith (CEO)
- Products: Single Family Rental Homes and Communities
- Revenue: ▲US$1.143 billion (2019)
- Net income: ▲US$85 million (2019)
- Total assets: ▲US$9.100 billion (2019)
- Total equity: ▲US$6.018 billion (2019)
- Number of employees: 1,725 (December 2023)
- Website: www.amh.com

American Homes 4 Rent, doing business as AMH, is a real estate investment trust based in Las Vegas, Nevada, that invests in single-family rental homes. As of December 31, 2019, the company owned 52,552 homes in 22 states. Its largest concentrations are in Atlanta (9.3% of total homes), Dallas-Fort Worth (8.4% of total homes), and Charlotte, North Carolina (7.2% of total homes).

== History ==
The company was established in October 2012 by B. Wayne Hughes, the founder of Public Storage. It was one of the first large public companies to begin investing heavily in single-family homes, following the entry of The Blackstone Group into the field in 2012. Early funding for the company included a $600 million investment from the Alaska Permanent Fund.

In August 2013, the company became a public company via an initial public offering.

In March 2016, the company merged with American Residential Properties, Inc.

In January 2023, the company announced a branding change from American Homes 4 Rent to AMH in a public news release and a notice to investors.

== See also ==
- History and impact of institutional investment in housing in the United States
