= B. Wayne Hughes =

American businessman (1933–2021)

- Born: Bradley Wayne Hughes; September 28, 1933; Gotebo, Oklahoma, U.S.
- Died: August 18, 2021 (aged 87); Lexington, Kentucky, U.S.
- Education: University of Southern California
- Occupation: Businessman
- Known for: Founder, Public Storage
- Spouse: Marjorie McKechnie (m. 1958; div. 1975) Kathleen Becker (m. 1983, divorced) Patricia Whitcraft (m. 2017)
- Children: 3, including Tamara Gustavson and B. Wayne Hughes Jr.

Bradley Wayne Hughes (September 28, 1933 – August 18, 2021) was an American billionaire businessman, the founder and chairman of Public Storage, the largest self-storage company in the U.S. doing business as a real estate investment trust (REIT). At the time of his death, Hughes had an estimated net worth of US$3.3 billion.

== Early life ==
Hughes was born in Gotebo, Oklahoma, on September 28, 1933. His family relocated to Los Angeles during the Dust Bowl, before making their home in El Monte, California. When Hughes was eleven, he was brought to his first horse race at Santa Anita Park by his father. He attended Mark Keppel High School, graduating in 1951. He was then awarded a scholarship to study at the University of Southern California, graduating in 1957.

== Career ==
Hughes started his career in Los Angeles real estate until the early 1970s. He subsequently established Public Storage in 1972. Initially operating out of a single location in El Cajon, California, it soon expanded to other sites around the country. Hughes served as the company's president and co-CEO from 1980 to November 1991 when he became chairman and sole CEO. He retired as CEO in November 2002 and remained chairman. He was also chairman and CEO from 1990 to March 1998 of Public Storage Properties XI, Inc, which was renamed PS Business Parks, Inc (PSB), an affiliated REIT.

In 2011, Hughes founded American Homes 4 Rent (AH4R), now known as American Homes, one of the largest single family rental owners in the United States.

=== Philanthropy ===
Hughes created and funded the Parker Hughes Cancer Center in Minnesota that undertakes the research to develop drugs and treatment for children's leukemia and cancer. After a $5 million donation to his alma mater, the Galen Center's basketball court was named after high school classmate and longtime friend Jim Sterkel. As of 2019, Hughes had donated between $400–450 million to USC, by far the most generous donor in the university's history. Most of the donations were anonymous, and he was friends with many notable USC athletes and athletic administrators, including O.J. Simpson, Al Cowlings, Sam Cunningham, and Lynn Swann, the latter of whom Hughes was credited with engineering his position as athletic director. In 2014, he was awarded an honorary Doctor of Business Administration from USC.

=== Politics ===
Hughes was the largest donor to American Crossroads, a conservative political organization started by Karl Rove. As of 2010, Hughes had contributed $1.55 million to the organization.

== Thoroughbred horse racing ==
Hughes was an owner of Thoroughbred racehorses since 1972. His horse, Authentic, won the 2020 Kentucky Derby and Breeders' Cup Classic. He acquired the historic 700-acre (2.8 km^{2}) Spendthrift Farm near Lexington, Kentucky, in June 2004.

Hughes' other notable horses included Action This Day, who won the 2003 Breeders' Cup Juvenile and was voted the Eclipse Award for Outstanding 2-Year-Old Male Horse. He also owned Beholder, who won the 2012 Breeders' Cup Juvenile Fillies and was voted American Champion Two-Year-Old Filly of 2012, won the 2013 Breeders' Cup Distaff and was voted American Champion Three-Year-Old Filly for 2013, was voted American Champion Older Dirt Female Horse for 2015, and won the 2016 Breeders' Cup Distaff over champion filly Songbird and was voted American Champion Older Dirt Female Horse for 2016.

== Personal life ==
Hughes married Marjorie McKechnie in 1958. Their son B. Wayne Hughes Jr. was born in 1959, and daughter Tamara in 1961. The couple divorced in 1975. He married Kathleen Becker in 1983. They had one son, Parker, born in 1990. Parker died in 1998 at eight years old from childhood leukemia. Hughes married his third wife, Patricia Whitcraft, in 2017.

Hughes died on August 18, 2021, at his home on Spendthrift Farm near Lexington, Kentucky, a month before his 88th birthday. The cause of death was not revealed.
