= Stephen Scherr =

American businessman

Stephen M. Scherr is an American business executive. He was the chief executive officer of Hertz and a member of its board of directors from February 2022 to March 2024. As of October 2024, he is co-President of Pretium Partners.

== Education ==
Scherr received his juris doctor at Harvard Law School. Before that he attended Woodrow Wilson School of Public and International Affairs at Princeton University where he obtained a bachelor of arts degree.

== Career ==
Scherr joined Goldman Sachs in 1993 as an investment banker, coming from practicing law at Cravath, Swaine & Moore. Scherr spent 28 years at Goldman Sachs in several different strategic and operational leadership roles. Before leaving Goldman Sachs, Scherr was the chief financial officer from 2018 to 2021.

Scherr was named Goldman Sachs’ Chief Strategy Officer in 2014, appointed to the Goldman Sachs Management Committee in 2012, became head of Goldman Sachs’ Latin American operations in 2011 and was the company’s Global Head of Financing.

In 2016, Scherr led Goldman Sachs’ launch of consumer banking, branded as Marcus. He also was CFO during the firm’s launch of AppleCard, in partnership with Apple, Inc., in 2019.

In 2022, Scherr was hired as CEO of Hertz Global Holdings, Inc. and his base salary for that year was $1.5 million with performance-based bonuses, options, and other perks that brought his total compensation package from Hertz to $182 million. If those targets had been met, he would have been the third-highest-paid CEO in the US that year.

Upon joining Hertz as CEO in 2022, Scherr inherited the company's strategy to significantly expand Hertz's electric vehicle fleet, first introduced in 2021.. In the fourth quarter of 2023, Hertz earnings dropped by $245 million due to depreciation of the value of these cars, as well as repairs costing approximately double what the repairs to a combustion engine would be. Starting in January 2024, Scherr initiated a reduction of Hertz's electric vehicle fleet, during which the company sold approximately 20,000 electric cars and used a portion of the proceeds to purchase internal combustion engine vehicles. In March 2024, Hertz announced that Scherr would step down at the end of the month, and that he would be replaced by Gil West.

== Affiliations ==
Scherr is on the board of the New York Stem Cell Foundation and the Jewish Museum in New York. He is also a member of The Council on Foreign Relations.

He is a supporter of children's cancer care and research. He and his wife Susan host the annual New York City fundraising event for Children's Cancer Cause and have donated to Memorial Sloan Kettering Cancer Center.
