= Hertz Car Sales =

Used car dealership

- Type: Public
- Traded as: NYSE: HTZ
- Industry: Used car Car dealership
- Founded: 1977; 49 years ago
- Headquarters: Estero, Florida, USA
- Area served: North America and parts of Western Europe
- Key people: Gil West (CEO, Hertz Global Holdings); Jeff Adams (EVP, Hertz Car Sales)
- Parent: Hertz Global Holdings
- Divisions: Hertz Car Sales UK
- Website: www.hertzcarsales.com

Hertz Car Sales is a division of Hertz Global Holdings that sells vehicles that were previously used in the Hertz car rental fleet. Based out of THC's headquarters in Estero, Florida, its largest operating market is in North America, with over 68 dealer locations in the U.S., but it also has units in France, Germany, Italy, Spain, and the United Kingdom.

== Background ==
In 2017, three years after Tyler Best was announced as chief information officer and Thomas Sabatino as chief administrative officer, The Hertz Corporation appointed Kathryn V. Marinello as its new CEO and president, including of Hertz Car Sales.

In May 2020, Paul Stone became chief executive officer of Hertz Global Holdings, days before the company filed for bankruptcy. On October 5, 2021, Mark Fields, a former chief executive of Ford, was named interim chief executive, and Stone stayed on as president and chief operating officer. He held those posts until he resigned in September 2023. Fields was succeeded in 2022 by Stephen Scherr, who had spent nearly 30 years at Goldman Sachs. On March 15, 2024, Hertz said that Scherr would step down as chief executive and give up his board seat, and that Gil West, formerly chief operating officer of Delta Air Lines and of General Motors' Cruise unit, would take over on April 1.

=== Fleet ===
Hertz Car Sales has developed a variety of ways to sell its fleet to businesses and consumers. The core methods used to facilitate these transactions are:

- Hertz Dealer Direct – A B2B platform developed by Hertz that allows for sales and services directly to automobile dealerships through an online portal and hertz representatives.
- Hertz Rent2Buy Program – An online platform that allows consumers to reserve active rental vehicles for a test drive for up to 3 days at a low rental rate. If a purchase is finalized, fees are waived.
- Hertz Car Sales Locations – Brick and mortar locations opened by Hertz that carry grounded rental vehicles that have been certified by Hertz and are available for purchase.

Hertz says cars sold as Hertz Certified come from its rental fleet and pass a 115-point inspection. They are sold with a 12-month or 12,000-mile powertrain warranty, 24-hour roadside assistance and a seven-day or 250-mile buy-back guarantee. Hertz does not negotiate prices and says they are often below the retail value suggested by Kelley Blue Book. The cars are mainly recent models, chiefly sedans, compact sport utility vehicles and luxury cars from the rental brands of its parent company, among them Dollar Rent A Car and Thrifty Car Rental.

=== Locations ===
Hertz Car Sales operates in select countries worldwide and through Hertz licensees. While Hertz Dealer Direct is available in the US and Canada, Hertz Car Sales maintains 68 rental locations across the United States.

In November 2026 Hertz confirmed that the dedicated Hertz Car Sales locations would close and that cars would instead be sold on the company website, on Amazon and eBay, and through the TestDrive+ extended test-drive program at Hertz rental locations. The company did not say how many locations would close or when.

== Online sales ==
Hertz Car Sales became the first seller of cars from its own rental fleet to list on Amazon Autos, beginning on August 20, 2025. The listings were open to buyers living within 75 miles of Dallas, Houston, Los Angeles or Seattle, who completed the purchase on Amazon and collected the car from a Hertz Car Sales location. On September 30, 2025, Hertz began selling cars through its own website, which until then had only displayed inventory. By that date the Amazon arrangement had been extended from the four cities of the initial launch to all 45 Hertz Car Sales locations. In May 2026 the company opened a showroom on eBay carrying more than 8,000 cars with its Hertz Certified designation. Purchases there were completed through eBay's Secure Purchase service.
