= Gil West =

American businessman

Wayne "Gil" West is an American businessman, and the CEO of Hertz Global Holdings since April 2024.

West earned a bachelor's degree in mechanical engineering from North Carolina State University in 1984, and an MBA from National University in 1990.

West was chief operating officer (COO) of Delta Air Lines from March 2014 to October 2020. He was COO of General Motors' self-driving cars Cruise division from January 2021 to December 2023.

On 15 March 2024, it was announced that West would succeed Stephen Scherr as CEO of Hertz on 1 April 2024.
