= History and impact of institutional investment in housing in the United States =

Impact of investors on American housing

The logo of Blackstone

During the 2008 financial crisis and subsequent Great Recession, house prices in the United States declined overall. Despite the decline in prices, many traditional purchasers of single-family homes—individuals and families—remained priced out of the market, leading to concerns that a lack of demand would cause home prices to collapse, exacerbating the recession. In 2012, in an effort to create demand, Fannie Mae placed several thousand foreclosed-upon homes for sale in a single transaction. This sale helped establish single-family property portfolios as a potential investment for large institutional investors, as opposed to one chiefly appealing to individual families and small-time investors.

Before the declines in housing prices after the 2000s United States housing bubble, relatively high property costs and the decentralized geography of individual homes made them unappealing as an asset class for direct investment. Broadly, financial professionals and real estate investors, such as Sam Zell, were skeptical that they could function as portfolios, even as some firms began to purchase homes en-masse. This push was "led" by private equity and alternative investment firm Blackstone, which founded Invitation Homes to purchase individual homes in depressed markets around the United States. These markets were concentrated in the Sun Belt cities, which include Atlanta, Phoenix, and Orlando. As of 2022, major single-family home owners include Invitation Homes, Pretium, and American Homes 4 Rent.

Large, single-family home investors and operators have received criticism from tenants for high rents, poor conditions, and poor treatment. Politicians and members of the public have also asserted that these investors charge unfair rents and limit purchasing opportunities for individual families, contributing to a shortage of affordable housing.

Others have disputed the impact of large institutional investors on U.S. housing prices, or suggested that the impact is limited to particular metro areas or neighborhoods. According to John Burns Research & Consulting, only 0.4 percent of single-family homes in the United States are owned by institutional investors with over 1,000 homes in their portfolio. This share rises to 3.8 percent of single-family homes for institutional investors owning over 100 homes, and up to 10 percent in certain metro areas such as Atlanta. Housing researcher Paul Fiorilla, quoted in the Washington Post, stated that it is unlikely that large institutional investors have a significant impact on prices, except for select areas where their concentrations are unusually high: "'Any segment that owns such a small percentage of the market cannot have that much of an impact on prices,' with the possible exception of a handful of communities with a significant concentration of big investors." Some housing advocates have argued that public attention to large institutional investors distracts from structural causes of the housing affordability crisis, such as the housing shortage and its roots in exclusionary zoning and other laws that empower NIMBY obstruction of housing.
