= Extra Space Storage =

American self-storage company

Extra Space Storage Inc.
- Type: Public
- Traded as: NYSE: EXR; S&P 500 component
- Industry: Real Estate Investment Trust
- Founded: 1977; 49 years ago
- Founder: Kenneth Woolley
- Headquarters: Cottonwood Heights, Utah, U.S.
- Number of locations: 4,011 stores (2024)
- Key people: Kenneth Woolley (Chairman); Joseph D. Margolis (CEO)
- Products: Self storage
- Revenue: ▲US$3.26 billion (2024)
- Operating income: ▲US$1.32 billion (2024)
- Net income: ▲US$855 million (2024)
- Total assets: ▲US$28.8 billion (2024)
- Total equity: ▲US$13.9 billion (2024)
- Number of employees: 8,012 (2024)
- Website: www.extraspace.com

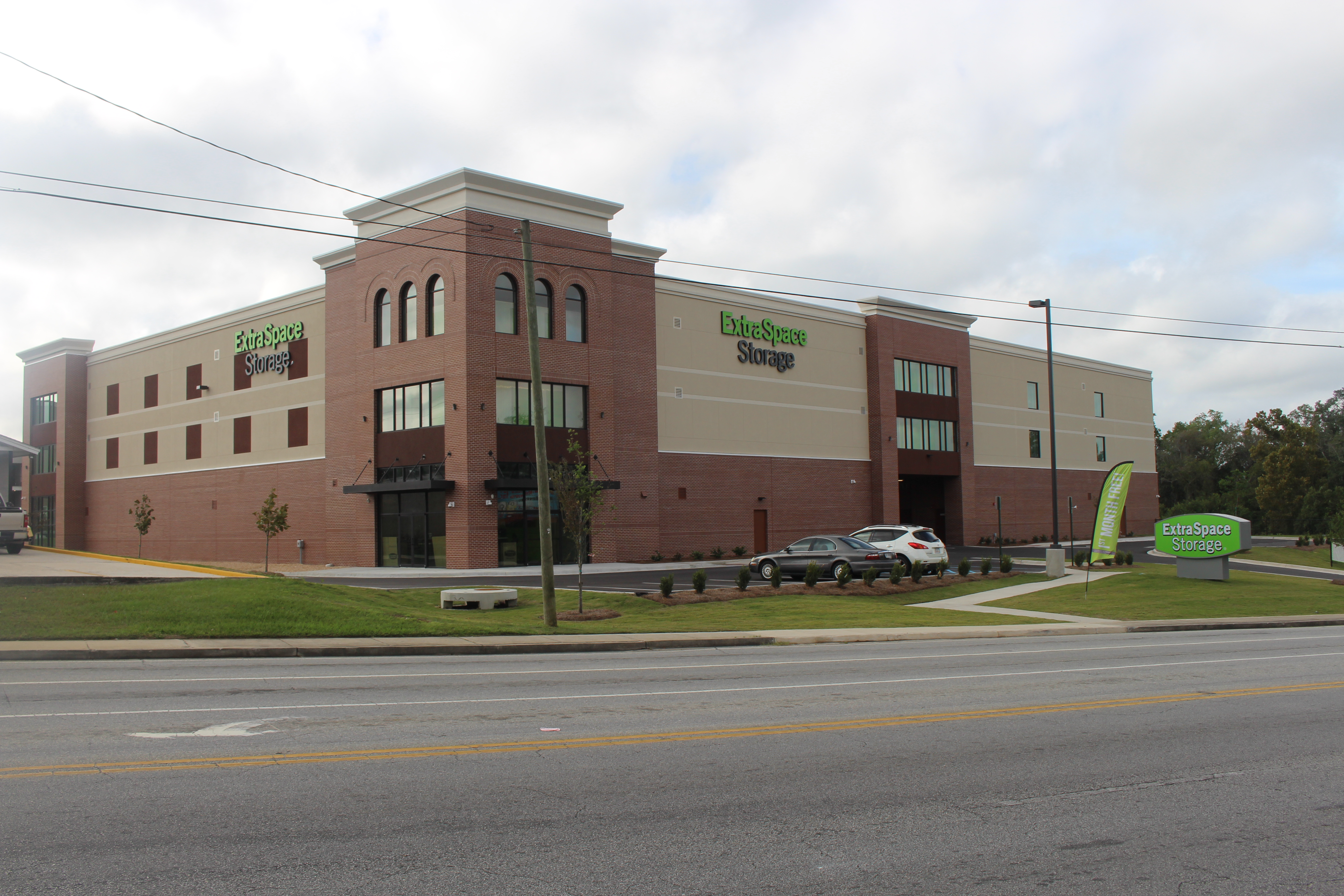
Extra Space Storage facility in Remerton, Lowndes County, Georgia

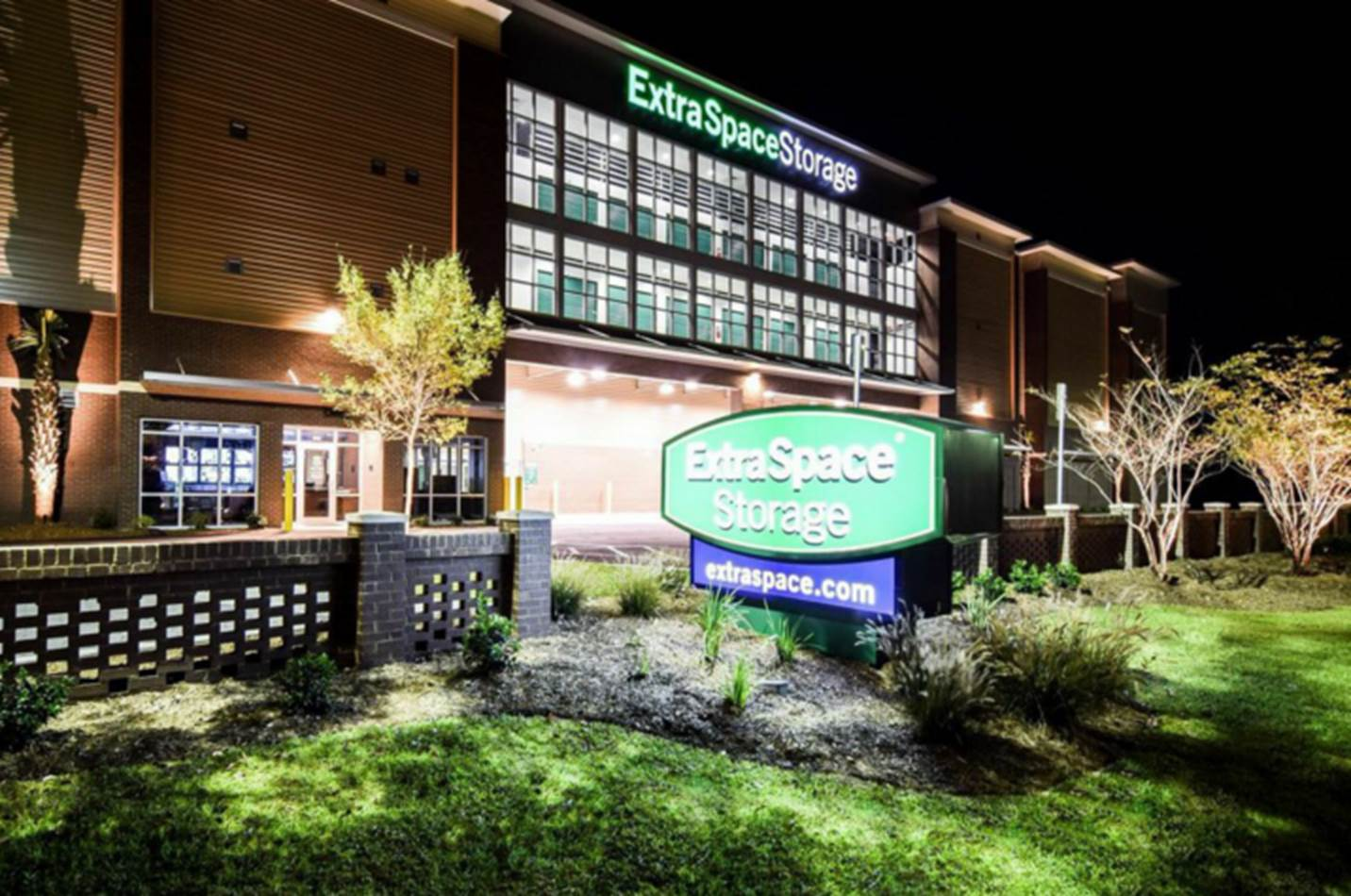
Extra Space Storage facility in Charleston, South Carolina, on St. Andrews Blvd

Extra Space Storage Inc. is an American real estate investment trust headquartered in Cottonwood Heights, Utah that invests in self storage facilities. The company rents storage units, including climate controlled units, drive-up units, lockers, boat storage, RV storage and business storage under the brands Extra Space Storage, Life Storage, and Storage Express. As of April 29, 2025 the company owned and/or operated 3,714 locations in 43 states, and Washington, D.C. comprising approximately 2.6 million units 283.4 million square feet of net rentable space. It is the largest owner of self storage units in the United States and the largest self storage property manager.

Extra Space Storage has won NAREIT's Leader in the Light Award for superior and sustained sustainability efforts in 2020, 2021 and 2023. The company has solar installations at many of its properties and was listed on the "Top 25 Corporate Users by Number of Solar Installations" by the Solar Energy Industries Association.
