= Invitation Homes =

American home rental company

Invitation Homes Inc.
- Type: Public company
- Traded as: NYSE: INVH; S&P 500 component
- Industry: Real estate investment trust
- Founded: 2012; 14 years ago
- Founders: Dallas B. Tanner; Brad Greiwe
- Headquarters: Comerica Bank Tower; Dallas, Texas, U.S.
- Key people: Dallas B. Tanner (CEO), Charles Young (President/COO), Jon Olsen(CFO)
- Products: Leasehold estates
- Revenue: ▲US$1.997 billion (2021)
- Net income: ▲US$261.4 million (2021)
- Total assets: ▲US$18.54 billion (2021)
- Total equity: ▲US$9.798 billion (2021)
- Number of employees: 1,240 (December 2021)
- Website: invitationhomes.com

Invitation Homes Inc. is a real estate investment trust that invests in single-family rental houses in the United States. It is headquartered in the Lincoln Center building in Dallas, Texas.

As of December 2025, the company owned 86,192 rental homes, averaging 1,880 square feet each, in 16 markets, making it the largest owner of single-family rental homes in the United States. The company's largest markets are Atlanta (12.9% of 2025 revenue), South Florida (11.9% of 2025 revenues), Southern California (10.9% of 2025 revenues), Tampa (10.7% of 2025 revenue), and Phoenix (9.5% of 2025 revenues).

As of 2019, tenants were typically in their late-30s with children and household income of approximately $100,000.

== History ==
=== 2005–2012: Background and formation ===
In 2005, entrepreneur Dallas Tanner and several others formed the housing and apartment investment company Treehouse Group in Arizona. Between 2010 and 2011, it bought 1,000 distressed houses in Phoenix, Arizona, a city heavily impacted by foreclosures caused by the subprime mortgage crisis and one of the first areas where private equity investor purchases of homes for rent took place after the Great Recession.

In 2011, Treehouse merged with the Dallas-based property management firm Riverstone Residential. The company was acquired by Blackstone Inc in the spring of 2012, forming Invitation Homes, with Blackstone giving Treehouse and Residential more capital to expand the business.

=== 2012–2016: Expansion ===
Invitation Homes' first home purchase was in April 2012, and within a year the company had spent $4 billion on 24,000 homes in the United States, becoming the largest buyer of homes for rent in the United States; section 8 properties made up 16% of the portfolio. In April 2013, it made a $100-million-plus purchase of 1,400 Atlanta homes from Building and Land Technology.

From August 2012 to June 2013, Invitation Homes purchased 1,650 homes in the Tampa Bay Area for over $250 million. In June, 85% of Tampa Bay online listings by Invitation Homes were above the area's average rent of $1,200. At the time, corporate home owners like Invitation Homes were purchasing houses in "strike zones," neighborhoods located near several jobs, schools, and transportation systems that were also facing high amounts of foreclosures, and rented them to middle-aged parents raising children making around $100,000 a year or more.

Invitation Homes created an asset class of single-family rental securities (SFR) in 2013 to raise money for purchasing and restoring houses. In 2016, Invitation Homes instituted its "Resident First Look" program where some renters would be given an option to purchase the homes they rent.

=== 2017: Initial public offering and merger ===
By January 2017, nearly $10 billion of the company's SFR bonds were sold a number that went to $15 billion in July 2018. On January 23, 2017, Fannie Mae funded $1 billion of debt to Invitation Homes as back-up money; four years prior, Fannie stopped another government-sponsored entity buying distressed homes, and Fannie's acquisition with the Blackstone entity was the first time in history it backstopped a single-family house landlord company. According to Corinne Russell, spokesperson of Fannie Mae regulator Federal Housing Finance Agency (FHFA), the deal was a way for Fannie Mae and Freddie Mac to learn about the mechanics of the single-family rent market and what the government enterprises' role should be in it.

The decision received criticism from more than 25 affordable-housing advocate groups, who believed Fannie Mae wasn't following its principle of protecting home owners. In February, Invitation Homes became a public company via an initial public offering, the second-largest initial public offering of a real estate investment trust (REIT) in the United States with $1.77 billion. The IPO was the largest by a U.S.-based REIT since 2014. In November 2017, Invitation Homes merged with Starwood Waypoint, a corporate spin-off of Starwood Capital Group, the resulting company will be known as Invitation Homes.

=== July 2018: Reuters investigative report and other tenant complaints ===
In July 2018, an investigative report by Reuters on the company showed that:

- In some neighborhoods, the company owned 25% of the single-family rental housing stock.
- A December 2016 Federal Reserve Bank of Atlanta study reported Invitation Homes evicted 15% of its renters and that being African-American also increased chances of being evicted.
- Invitation Homes raised rents by an average of as much as 10% per year in some markets such as Oakland, California, double the norm for these markets.
- There have been three protests at Blackstone's California offices by Invitation Homes tenants organized by ACCE, such as one in October 2017 at Blackstone's Santa Monica headquarters, which involved the tenants placing letters on the desks to hold a meeting with the corporation's executives and stop practices of excessive rent prices, fees, and poor maintenance; the company never got back to them.
- In May 2018, tenants filed a class action against the corporation in the United States District Court for the Northern District of California, with a rationale of excessive rent price increases and fees; they reported being charged $95 if even a minute late on a rent payment, regardless if the company's online payment system is broken, and filing eviction notices that added more "unfair" legal costs, fees, and penalties for them to bear. On July 20, Invitation Homes responded with a motion that stated the class action group and its plaintiff had too little evidence.
- Ex-employees have stated that the company spent too little on repairs.
- Lender appraisals on the properties were not thorough.

The company responded that its overall customer satisfaction ratings, based on its surveys, was high.

In 2018 and 2019, tenant complaints at the company's properties were the subject of articles by WGCL-TV, CBS Sacramento, The Arizona Republic, and WTVF. Complaints included mold, sewage, and water leakage; nails poking out; infestation of vermin such as spiders, cockroaches, and ants; broken appliances such as garage doors, heating systems, stoves, and microwaves; and unfulfilled repair requests are frequent issues.

=== 2019-present ===
In November 2019, Blackstone divested its share of Invitation Homes. Invitation Homes created a joint venture in October 2020 with Rockpoint Group to purchase $1 billion in single-family homes in Dallas, Seattle, South Florida and other U.S. markets. In July 2021, the company launched a joint venture with Atlanta, Georgia-based home construction company PulteGroup, where Pulte was projected to design and build approximately 7,500 new homes over the next five years for sale to Invitation Homes for inclusion in their single-family rental leasing portfolio. In July 2023, the company acquired a portfolio of 1,900 rental homes in the Southeastern United States for $650 million. In the summer of 2023, the company acquired 264 homes in Clark County, Nevada, from Starwood Capital Group for $98 million. In July 2024, the company agreed to pay $20 million to settle allegations of unpermitted renovations.

In September 2024, Invitation Homes reached a settlement with the Federal Trade Commission (FTC), in which the company agreed to refund $48 million to customers harmed by its alleged "variety of unfair and deceptive tactics, from saddling people with hidden fees and unjustly withholding security deposits to misleading people about eviction policies during the pandemic." In March 2026, the FTC mailed 444,131 checks to renters who claim to have been misled by Invitation Homes. As part of the settlement, Invitation Homes is required to incorporate mandatory fees into its advertised rental prices, implement fairer procedures for returning security deposits, and discontinue certain eviction practices.

In May 2025, the company acquired 152 townhomes in Wendell, North Carolina, for $41.4 million. In January 2026, the company acquired ResiBuilt, an Atlanta-based homebuilder and developer, for $89 million.

== See also ==
- History and impact of institutional investment in housing in the United States
