= FTSE SmallCap Index =

British stock market index

FTSE SmallCap

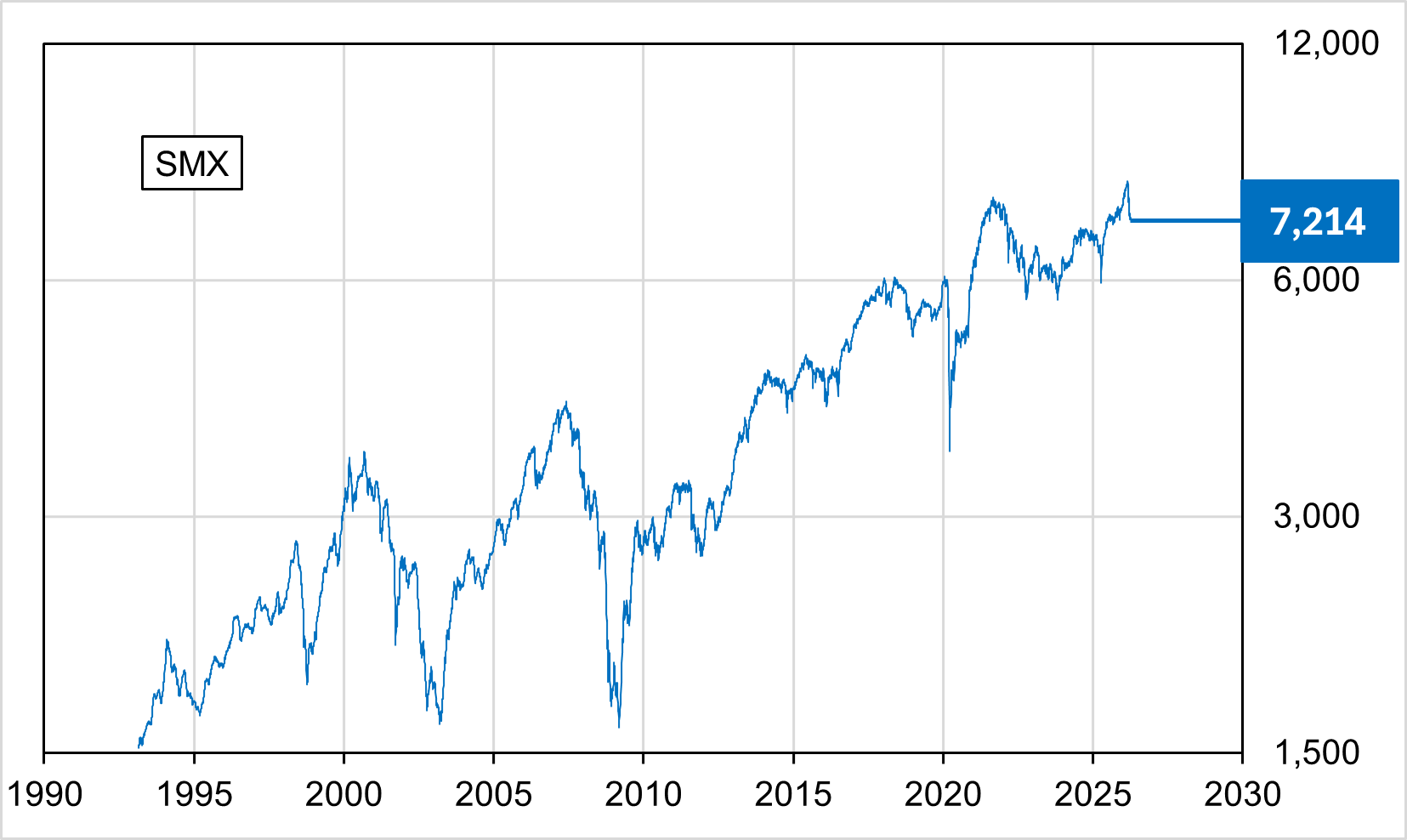
- Performance of the FTSE SmallCap index from 1993 to 2026
- Foundation: 16 March 2000
- Operator: FTSE Russell
- Exchanges: London Stock Exchange
- Trading symbol: SMX
- Constituents: 182 (March 2026)
- Type: Small-cap
- Market cap: £34 billion (March 2026)
- Weighting method: Capitalisation-weighted
- Related indices: FTSE 100 Index; FTSE 250 Index; FTSE 350 Index; FTSE All-Share Index; FTSE Fledgling Index; FTSE AIM UK 50 Index
- Website: www.lseg.com/en/ftse-russell/indices/uk
- Reuters: .FTSC
- Bloomberg: SMX:IND

The FTSE SmallCap Index is an index of small market capitalisation companies consisting of the 351st to the 619th largest-listed companies on the London Stock Exchange main market. The index, which is maintained by FTSE Russell, a subsidiary of the London Stock Exchange Group, is a constituent of the FTSE All-Share Index which is an index of all 620 companies listed on the main market of the LSE.

This Index value is re-calculated in real-time and published every minute.

== Annual returns ==
The following table lists the Total Return of the FTSE SmallCap index up to 31 March 2026.

Year	Total return (%)
2019	11.41
2020	4.52
2021	20.01
2022	−16.35
2023	2.96
2024	10.70
2025	14.40

== Constituents ==
Constituents have included:

Company	Ticker	FTSE Industry Classification Benchmark sector
Aberforth Split Level Income Trust	ASIT	Investment Trust
AEW UK REIT	AEWU	REIT
Aptitude Software Group	APTD	Software
Artemis Alpha Trust	ATS	Investment Trust
Atrato Onsite Energy	ROOF	Investment Trust
Augmentum Fintech	AUGM	Investment Trust
Baillie Gifford European Growth Trust	BGEU	Investment Trust
Baillie Gifford Shin Nippon	BGS	Investment Trust
CAB Payments	CABP	Financial Services
Capita	CPI	Specialty Business Services
Capital Limited	CAPD	Other Industrial Metals & Mining
Capricorn Energy	CNE	Oil, Gas and Coal
Card Factory	CARD	Specialty Retail
City of London Investment Group	CLIG	Asset Management
CLS Holdings	CLI	Real Estate Investment and Services
CQS Natural Resources	CYN	Investment Trust
CT Private Equity Trust	CTPE	Investment Trust
Custodian Reit	CREI	Investment Trust
DFS Furniture	DFS	Furnishings, Fixtures & Appliances
Digital 9 Infrastructure	DGI9	Investment Trust
Evoke	EVOK	Gambling
Fidelity Asian Values	FAS	Investment Trust
Fidelity Japan Trust	FJV	Investment Trust
Foresight Sustainable Forestry Company	FSF	Investment Trust
Forterra	FORT	Building Materials
Foxtons	FOXT	Real Estate Services
Fuller, Smith & Turner	FSTA	Restaurants
Gulf Marine Services	GMS	Oil, Gas and Coal
Headlam Group	HEAD	Furnishings, Fixtures & Appliances
Helical	HLCL	Real Estate Services
Henry Boot	BOOT	Real Estate - Diversified
Hostelworld Group	HSW	Travel Services
James Fisher & Sons	FSJ	Marine Shipping
JZ Capital Partners	JZCP	Closed End Investments
Kenmare Resources	KMR	Other Industrial Metals & Mining
Lindsell Train	LTI	Investment Trust
Liontrust Asset Management	LIO	Asset Management
Lowland Investment Company	LWI	Investment Trust
LSL Property Services	LSL	Real Estate Services
Luceco	LUCE	Electrical Equipment & Parts
Macfarlane Group	MACF	Packaging & Containers
Majedie Investments	MAJE	Investment Trust
Marston's	MARS	Restaurants
Mears Group	MER	Personal Services
Mid Wynd International Investment Trust	MWY	Investment Trust
M J Gleeson	GLE	Residential Construction
Mobius Investment Trust	MMIT	Investment Trust
Motorpoint Group	MOTR	Auto & Truck Dealerships
NewRiver	NRR	REIT
Norcros	NXR	Building Products & Equipment
On The Beach Group	OTB	Travel Services
Palace Capital	PCA	REIT
Petra Diamonds	PDL	Other Precious Metals & Mining
Pharos Energy	PHAR	Oil & Gas E&P
Phoenix Spree Deutschland	PSDL	Investment Trust
Porvair	PRV	Pollution & Treatment Controls
Reach	RCH	Publishing
Record	REC	Asset Management
Riverstone Energy	RSE	Investment Trust
Robert Walters	RWA	Staffing & Employment Services
S & U	SUS	Credit Services
Sabre Insurance	SBRE	Insurance Brokers
Schroder Income Growth Fund	SCF	Investment Trust
Schroders Capital Global Innovation Trust	INOV	Investment Trust
Secure Trust Bank	STB	Banks - Regional
Severfield	SFR	Engineering & Construction
SIG	SHI	Industrial Distribution
Smiths News	SNWS	Publishing
Speedy Hire	SDY	Rental & Leasing Services
Starwood European Real Estate Finance	SWEF	Investment Trust
Strategic Equity Capital	SEC	Investment Trust
STV Group	STVG	Broadcasting
Synthomer	SYNT	Specialty Chemicals
The Gym Group	GYM	Leisure
Topps Tiles	TPT	Home Improvement Retail
Treatt	TET	Specialty Chemicals
Trifast	TRI	Tools & Accessories
TT Electronics	TTG	Electronic Components
Ultimate Products	ULTP	Household Goods and Home Construction
Vanquis Banking Group	VANQ	Credit Services
Videndum	VID	Consumer Electronics
Xaar	XAR	Computer Hardware
Zotefoams	ZTF	Specialty Chemicals

== See also ==
- FTSE 100
- FTSE 250
