= FTSE Group =

British provider of stock market indices

FTSE
- Company type: Subsidiary
- Industry: Finance
- Founded: 1995
- Founder: London Stock Exchange Group; Pearson
- Headquarters: 10 Upper Bank Street; London, England
- Key people: Arne Staal (CEO)
- Products: Financial indices
- Parent: London Stock Exchange Group
- Website: ftserussell.com

FTSE International Limited trading as FTSE Russell (Note: Shared the trading name with sister company Frank Russell Company) (/ˈfʊtsi/ "Footsie") is a British provider of stock market indices and associated data services, wholly owned by the London Stock Exchange (LSE) and operating from premises in Canary Wharf. It operates the well known UK FTSE 100 Index as well as a number of other indices. FTSE stands for Financial Times Stock Exchange.

== History ==
The FTSE Group was created in 1995 by Pearson (former parent of the Financial Times) and the London Stock Exchange Group.

In 2005, together with Dow Jones, FTSE launched the Industry Classification Benchmark, a taxonomy used to segregate markets into sectors.

In 2010, the joint venture with Xinhua Finance was terminated, the index series was renamed into FTSE China Index Series; the Hong Kong incorporated company was renamed to "FTSE China Index Limited".

In 2011, Pearson sold its stake to LSE.

== Main business ==
FTSE Group operates 250,000 indices calculated across 80 countries and in 2015 was the number three provider of indices worldwide by revenue. FTSE Group earns around 60 per cent of revenue from annual subscription fees and 40 per cent from licensing for index-based products.

Clients include both active and passive fund managers, consultants, asset owners, sell-side firms and financial data vendors. FTSE's products are used by market participants worldwide for investment analysis, performance measurement, asset allocation and hedging. Pension funds, asset managers, ETF providers and investment banks work with FTSE to benchmark their investment performance and use FTSE's indices to create ETFs, index tracking funds, structured products and index derivatives. FTSE also provides many exchanges around the world with their domestic indices.

Fees from the use of index information and associated services generate revenues necessary to continue operations. FTSE has offices in London, New York City, Paris, Frankfurt, Madrid, Milan, San Francisco, Beijing, Sydney, Tokyo, Hong Kong and Toronto.

== Products ==
FTSE Group operates the well known FTSE 100 Index and FTSE 250 Index as well as over 200,000 other indices, including 600 real-time indices.

=== Other indices ===
- FTSE Global Equity Index Series: series of various global stock indices
- FTSE 350 Index
- FTSE All-Share Index
- FTSE SmallCap Index
- FTSE4Good Index
- FTSE AIM UK 50 Index
- FTSE AIM 100 Index
- FTSE AIM All-Share Index
- FTSE MIB

== See also ==
- List of stock exchanges in the United Kingdom, the British Crown Dependencies and United Kingdom Overseas Territories
- List of stock exchanges in the Commonwealth of Nations
