= Octagonal plc =

British financial services company

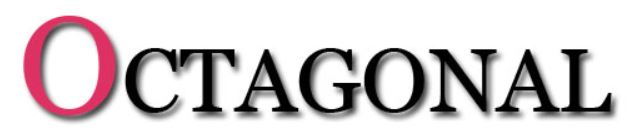
- Company type: Public
- Traded as: AIM: OCT; AIM Component
- Industry: Financial services
- Founded: 2007; 19 years ago
- Headquarters: London, UK
- Key people: John W Gunn (chairman)
- Products: ISA, Fixed rate bond
- Services: Investment Management, Stockbroking, Corporate Finance, Custodian
- Revenue: £5.6 million (2017)
- Operating income: £1.313 million (2017)
- Net income: £1.002 million (2017)
- Subsidiaries: Global Investment Strategy UK Ltd; SynerGIS Capital
- Website: gisukltd.com

Octagonal plc is a holding company headquartered in London. The company is listed on the London Stock Exchange and is a constituent of the FTSE AIM All-Share Index. Octagonal currently has a 100% stake in Global Investment Strategy UK Ltd or 'GIS'.

== History ==
Octagonal was founded in 2007 as an investment company, and acquired a 9.97% stake in Global Investment Strategy in April 2014. In 2015, Octagonal announced it had entered into a conditional agreement to acquire the remaining issued share capital of GIS. Octagonal raised £1.7 million through a placing of new shares, and the acquisition constituted a reverse takeover under the AIM Rules for Companies.

Global Investment Strategy UK Ltd was founded in 2002 and established in its current form in 2004, by city deal maker John Gunn.

In March 2017, Octagonal opened an office in Hong Kong. In November 2017, GIS announced the soft launch of the SynerGIS Bond, a fixed-rate bond offered to retail investors.

== Operations ==
Global Investment Strategy UK Ltd or "GIS" is a financial services company headquartered in London. It is a member of the London Stock Exchange and is regulated by the Financial Conduct Authority. GIS is also a HMRC Authorized ISA Manager.

Since 2015, GIS has administered over a quarter of a million transactions with settlement values exceeding £50 billion.
