= Alternative Investment Market =

Sub-market of the London Stock Exchange

AIM
- Type: Stock exchange
- Location: London, England, UK
- Founded: 19 June 1995
- Owner: London Stock Exchange Group
- Key people: Marcus Stuttard (Head of UK Primary Markets and AIM)
- Currency: GBP, US$
- No. of listings: 821
- Website: AIM homepage on London Stock Exchange website

AIM (formerly the Alternative Investment Market) is a sub-market of the London Stock Exchange that was launched on 19 June 1995 as a replacement to the previous Unlisted Securities Market (USM) that had been in operation since 1980. It allows companies that are smaller, less-developed, or want/need a more flexible approach to governance to float shares with a more flexible regulatory system than is applicable on the main market.

At launch, AIM comprised only 10 companies valued collectively at £82.2 million. As at May 2021, 821 companies comprised the sub-market, with an average market cap of £80 million per listing. AIM has also started to become an international exchange, often due to its low regulatory burden, especially in relation to the US Sarbanes–Oxley Act (though only a quarter of AIM-listed companies would qualify to be listed on a US stock exchange even prior to passage of the Sarbanes–Oxley Act). By December 2005, over 270 foreign companies had been admitted to AIM.

The FTSE Group maintains three indices for measuring AIM, which are the FTSE AIM UK 50 Index, FTSE AIM 100 Index, and FTSE AIM All-Share Index.

== Regulatory model ==
AIM is an exchange regulated venue featuring an array of principles-based rules for publicly held companies. AIM's regulatory model is based on a comply-or-explain option that lets companies that are floated on AIM either comply with AIM's relatively few rules, or explain why it has decided not to comply with them.

=== Nominated Advisers (Nomads) ===
Aside from granting leeway in regard to regulatory compliance, the Exchange also mandates continuous oversight and advice by the issuer's underwriter, referred to as a Nominated Adviser (Nomad). Firms seeking admission to the AIM must appoint a Nomad at least 12–24 weeks prior to their admission and retain one during their entire period of listing. The role of Nomads is central to AIM's regulatory model, as these entities play the role of gatekeepers, advisers and regulators of AIM companies. In advising each firm as to which rules should be complied with and the manner in which existing requirements should be met, Nomads provide the essential service of allowing firms to abide by tailor-made regulation, reducing regulatory costs in the process. Theoretically, Nomads are liable for damages from tolerating misdemeanors on behalf of their supervised companies, including the loss of reputational capital. However, this heavy reliance on Nomads has been criticised as creating a conflict of interest, since Nomads receive fees from the companies they purportedly supervise while, in practice, managing to avoid liability for market misconduct.

In 2006, the London Stock Exchange launched a review of Nomad activities, resulting in a regulatory "handbook" for Nomads published by the Financial Services Authority in 2007.

=== Self-regulation ===
AIM is an unregulated market segment, therefore it escapes most of the mandatory provisions contained in European Union directives – as implemented in the UK – and other rules applicable to companies listed in the LSE. AIM believes self-regulation is pivotal to AIM's low regulatory burden: companies seeking an AIM listing are not subject to significant admission requirements; after admission is granted, firms must comply with ongoing obligations which are comparatively lower to the ones that govern the operation of larger exchanges; and certain corporate governance provisions are not mandatory for AIM companies. Therefore, AIM-listed companies are often subject to manipulation by institutional investors. AIM-listed companies usually are only required to adhere to the corporate governance requirements of their home jurisdiction, which, as a practical matter, vary widely.

However, the regulatory requirements are more onerous than for private companies and AIM listed plcs are required to prepare audited annual accounts under IFRS.

=== Investor base ===
Another important element of AIM's model is the composition of its investor base. Although AIM-listed companies are not start-ups, most are small and potentially more risky than a FTSE listing. This may prove to be hazardous for unsophisticated investors who lack both the knowledge and resources to conduct proper inquiries into a firm's prospects and activities, or even larger investors which lack strong internal control and risk management requirements. As a consequence, AIM's investor base is largely composed of institutional investors and wealthy individuals.

== Market capitalisation ==
The following table lists the 10 biggest AIM companies on 31 May 2021.

| Rank | Company | Market Cap (GBP) |
|---|---|---|
| 1 | ASOS PLC | 4.869 billion |
| 2 | Boohoo Group PLC | 4.035 billion |
| 3 | Abcam PLC | 3.211 billion |
| 4 | Hutchmed (China) Ltd | 3.060 billion |
| 5 | Fevertree Drinks PLC | 2.977 billion |
| 6 | Jet2 PLC | 2.897 billion |
| 7 | RWS Holdings PLC | 2.487 billion |
| 8 | ITM Power PLC | 2.166 billion |
| 9 | Ceres Power Holdings PLC | 2.070 billion |
| 10 | Keywords Studios PLC | 1.967 billion |

== Companies ==
The following table lists the top 100 AIM companies by market capitalisation on 25 April 2020.

List of all Alternative Investment Market constituents
| Company | Ticker |
|---|---|
| AB Dynamics plc | ABDP |
| Abcam plc | ABC |
| Advanced Medical Solutions Group plc | AMS |
| Alliance Pharma Plc | APH |
| Alpha Financial Markets Consulting Plc | AFM |
| Alpha Group International plc | ALPH |
| Andrews Sykes Group plc | ASY |
| Applegreen plc | APGN |
| ASOS plc | ASC |
| Atalaya Mining plc | ATYM |
| Benchmark Holdings plc | BMK |
| Blue Prism plc | PRSM |
| Boohoo Group plc | BOO |
| Breedon Group plc | BREE |
| Brooks Macdonald Group | BRK |
| Burford Capital Ltd | BUR |
| Bushveld Minerals Ltd | BMN |
| Camellia | CAM |
| Caretech Holdings plc | CTH |
| Central Asia Metals | CAML |
| Ceres Power Holdings | CWR |
| Clinigen Group plc | CLIN |
| Codemasters Group Holdings Limited | CDM |
| Cohort plc | CHRT |
| Craneware plc | CRW |
| Creo Medical Group Plc | CREO |
| CVS Group plc | CVSG |
| Dart Group plc | DTG |
| Diversified Gas & Oil Plc | DGOC |
| dotDigital Group plc | DOTD |
| Draper Esprit plc | GROW |
| Eddie Stobart Logistics plc | ESL |
| Emis Group Plc | EMIS |
| Fevertree Drinks plc | FEVR |
| Focusrite plc | TUNE |
| Frontier Developments plc | FDEV |
| Gamma Communications Ltd | GAMA |
| Gateley Holdings plc | GTLY |
| GB Group plc | GBG |
| GlobalData plc | DATA |
| Gooch & Housego | GHH |
| Greencoat Renewables plc | GRP |
| Highland Gold Mining | HGM |
| Horizon Discovery Group plc | HZD |
| Hotel Chocolat Group plc | HOTC |
| Hurricane Energy plc | HUR |
| Hutchison China Meditech | HCM |
| Ideagen Plc | IDEA |
| IG Design Group plc | IGR |
| IMImobile plc | IMO |
| Impax Asset Management Group Plc | IPX |
| Iomart Group | IOM |
| IQE plc | IQE |
| ITM Power plc | ITM |
| Jadestone Energy Inc | JSE |
| James Halstead plc | JHD |
| Judges Scientific plc | JDG |
| Kape Technologies Plc | KAPE |
| Keywords Studios plc | KWS |
| Knights Group Hldgs | KGH |
| Learning Technologies Group plc | LTG |
| Loungers | LGRS |
| M P Evans Group Plc | MPE |
| Marlowe plc | MRL |
| Mattioli Woods Plc | MTW |
| Midwich Group plc | MIDW |
| Mortgage Advice Bureau (Holdings) Ltd | MAB1 |
| Next Fifteen Communications Group | NFC |
| Nichols plc | NICL |
| Numis Corporation | NUM |
| Pan African Resources plc | PAF |
| Pebble Group plc | PEBB |
| Polar Capital Holdings Plc | POLR |
| Premier Miton Group plc | PMI |
| PurpleBricks Group plc | PURP |
| Randall & Quilter Investment Holdings Ltd | RQIH |
| Renew Holdings Plc | RNWH |
| Restore Plc | RST |
| RWS Holdings plc | RWS |
| Scapa Group plc | SCPA |
| Secure Income REIT plc | SIR |
| Serica Energy Plc | SQZ |
| Silence Therapeutics plc | SLN |
| Smart Metering Systems plc | SMS |
| Strix Group plc | KETL |
| Sumo Group | SUMO |
| Team17 Group Plc | TM17 |
| Telit Communications Plc | TCM |
| Thorpe (F.W) plc | TFW |
| Tracsis plc | TRCS |
| Nexxen | NEXN |
| Uniphar plc | UPR |
| Victoria plc | VCP |
| Wandisco plc | WAND |
| Warehouse REIT plc | WHR |
| Watkin Jones plc | WJG |
| YouGov Plc | YOU |
| Young & Co's Brewery Plc (A shares) | YNGA |
| Young & Co's Brewery Plc (non-voting shares) | YNGN |

== Criticism ==
=== "Casino" environment ===
In March 2007, U.S. securities regulator Roel Campos suggested that AIM's rules for share trading have created a market like a casino. Campos reportedly said: "I'm concerned that 30% of issuers that list on AIM are gone in a year. That feels like a casino to me and I believe that investors will treat it as such." The comment resulted in several angry retorts, including one from the London Stock Exchange, which controls AIM, pointing out that the number of companies that go into liquidation or administration in a year is actually fewer than 2%.

AIM has since issued new rules requiring that listed companies maintain a website.

The calibre of participants in the market has also been criticised by fund manager John Hempton of Bronte Capital Management.

=== Crown Corporation / Langbar International fraud ===
In 2003 Langbar international was admitted to the AIM.

In 2011 Langbar's now former CEO, Stuart Pearson was found guilty of "three counts of making misleading statements by falsely claiming in stock market announcements that the company had assets held by Banco do Brasil and that some assets were being transferred to the company", jailed for 12 months and banned for being a company director for five years.

This £365 million ($750m) share fraud was investigated by the Serious Fraud Office and the City of London Police when it was discovered in November 2005 that Langbar had none of the assets it declared at listing. This was due in part because the Nomad (Nominated Adviser) failed to carry out due diligence. Also, the Exchange did not ensure that the AIM rules had been complied with. AIM changed the rules for Nomads in 2006. On 19 October 2007 they fined Nabarro Wells £250,000 ($512,500) and publicly censured them for breaches of the AIM rules.

== Trends ==
In March 2007 The Daily Telegraph noticed a tendency to use listing vehicles incorporated in offshore financial centres prior to floating on AIM. Some 35% of the companies floated on AIM during 2006 were from OFCs, of which the majority came from the Channel Islands or the British Virgin Islands.

On 29 January 2009 it was announced that AIM is to form the basis of an Asian-orientated growth or incubator market called 'Tokyo AIM', which will be run as a joint venture between the Tokyo Stock Exchange and LSE. Tokyo AIM will replicate AIM's system of oversight by NOMADs, with 'J-Nomads' being "selected and approved by TOKYO AIM ... to assess companies' suitability for the market". In July 2012, TOKYO AIM changed its name to TOKYO PRO Market, and since then Tokyo Stock Exchange, Inc. has continued to operate TOKYO AIM based on the original market concept.

== Dividends ==
As of 1 October 2018, just under a third of AIM-listed companies have paid shareholders a dividend within their most recent financial year. The largest companies to have paid dividends include: Fevertree Drinks PLC (FEVR), Burford Capital Ltd (BUR), and Abcam PLC (ABC). The smallest companies to have paid dividends include: Holders Technology PLC (HDT), Aeorema Communications PLC (AEO), and Stilo International (STL).

== See also ==
- First North – a similar market serving the Nordic countries
- Growth Enterprise Market – a similar market in Hong Kong
