= Expolink =

Expolink Europe Ltd
- Company type: Privately held company
- Industry: Business Services Governance, Risk Management, and Compliance Business Ethics
- Founded: 1995
- Founders: David and Jackie Crook
- Defunct: December 31, 2021
- Fate: Acquired
- Successor: NAVEX Global
- Headquarters: Wiltshire, United Kingdom
- Parent: NAVEX Global, Inc.

Expolink Europe Ltd (branded as Expolink) was a British company that provided independent whistleblower services. It was acquired by NAVEX Global on 3 June 2019 and in 2021 it was fully incorporated into NAVEX Global and made defunct as of 31 December 2021.

== History ==
Expolink was founded in 1995 by local business owners David and Jackie Crook. Its first offices were in Castle Coombe, Wiltshire but soon moved to a business park within Chippenham, Wiltshire.

The whistleblowing hotline service was created after the owners were alerted to an alleged instance of sexual harassment against one of their employees at a client's premises. Many of the company's first clients were local government authorities and Public limited companies.

At the time it was founded, Expolink was the first outsourced whistleblowing service provider in Europe. Expolink's staffed telephone hotline service was launched in 1995, becoming a 24/7 service in 2001. A web reporting platform was introduced later that decade, followed by online case delivery in 2014. A mobile app reporting channel was launched in March 2017.

As of 2019, Expolink worked with more than 750 organisations worldwide, with the majority headquartered in the UK and Europe. Its clients included L’Oréal, BAE Systems and the BBC. Expolink also worked with eight of the UK's top 10 retail banks and around one-third of companies listed on the FTSE 350 Index.

== Benchmarking report ==
Expolink published a Benchmarking Report annually, which summarised data from the thousands of whistleblowing reports it processed each year.

In 2018 it revealed that whistleblowing reports relating to workplace sexual harassment and abuse had risen 89%, linking the trend to recent media revelations and the impact of the #MeToo movement.

The company's 2019 Report highlighted a 57% increase in workplace whistleblowing rates between 2016 and 2018.
