= Vesna Radišić =

Serbian Engineer and principal scientists

- Education: University of Belgrade; University of Colorado at Boulder; UCLA
- Occupation: Electronic engineer
- Awards: Fellow of the IEEE
- Scientific career
- Workplaces: Northrop Grumman; Opnext; HRL Laboratories

Vesna Radišić is a principal scientist and lead for engineered RF materials at Northrop Grumman. She received the bachelor's degree in Electrical Engineering from University of Belgrade, Serbia in 1991, master's degree from University of Colorado at Boulder in 1993 and Ph.D. degree from UCLA in 1998.

Before joining Northrop Grumman in 2002, she worked at Opnext and HRL Laboratories. In 2017, she was elected Fellow of the Institute of Electrical and Electronics Engineers "for contributions to millimeter- and submillimeter-wave sources, amplifiers, and monolithic integrated circuits."
