= Alumasc Group =

UK company

Alumasc Group Plc
- Type: Public Limited Company
- Traded as: LSE: ALU
- Founded: 1945; 81 years ago
- Headquarters: United Kingdom
- Key people: Vijay Thakrar; (Interim executive chair); Pamela Bingham; (Chief Executive Officer - suspended)
- Products: Building & engineering products
- Revenue: ▼£76 million
- Website: www.alumasc.co.uk

Alumasc Group plc is a United Kingdom-based supplier of building and engineering products, with a specialism in sustainable building products designed to manage energy and water use in the built environment. The company is listed on the FTSE Fledgling Index of the London Stock Exchange under the ticker ALU in the construction and materials sector. It was once the biggest beer barrel manufacturer in Britain.

== History ==
Advertising for cast metal casks being produced by the company in 1952.

The company's original business, Alumasc Limited of Burton Latimer, was in the manufacture of aluminium products. In the 1950s it advertised cast metal beer casks which it claimed were preferred by the brewing industry to wooden casks as being more hygienic, stronger and lower maintenance. In 1960 the firm was taken over by Gold Fields Group. In 1962 it displayed a new type of aluminium beer cask at the Exhibition of Aluminium Goods at the Design Centre in London which was made from pressed sheet aluminium which it claimed was 40% lighter than a die-cast barrel though the company continued to make die-cast products, advertising its expertise in them in the Financial Times in 1970.

=== 1970s ===
The firm's association with the brewing industry continued into the 1970s when it won an award from the Design Council in 1978 for its Hy-Range Dispense System, which it claimed was the first piece of brewing equipment to win a Design Council award. According to the firm, the equipment enabled the licensed trade to tap and reseal a keg ready for use in seconds.

=== 1980s and 90s ===
In 1984, the firm's management, led by chairman and chief executive John McCall, bought out the business from Consolidated Gold Fields and by 1986, when it was announced that the firm would be floating on the London Stock Exchange, Alumasc was the biggest beer barrel manufacturer in Britain. The firm ran three divisions at the time, the beer-related products, one making components in a variety of materials for original equipment manufacturers, and another making aluminium building products. In addition, the firm owned Ingersoll Locks which it had acquired from Gold Fields when they decided to concentrate on mining. All had struggled owing to the recession of the early 1980s, particularly the cask business as beer consumption declined, apart from the building products division which had seen strong growth in demand for its aluminium guttering products. The Financial Times noted the varying fortunes of the different divisions and that the majority of the firm's profits still came from the slowest growing part of the firm, the beer-related products.

Profits in the 1980s and 90s were highly variable, first up then down following manufacturing problems with the production of kegs and long period where no orders were placed by customers. The firm continued to be highly dependent on beer related products. In 1995 it agreed to buy the West Midlands engineer Benjamin Priest for £35 million. Profits warnings were made in 1997 and by 1999 the company was loss making.

=== 2000s ===
In 2006, the company changed its stock market classification from Engineering Products to Construction and Building Products, reflecting the larger size of the building products division. In 2007, Alumasc acquired solar shading firm Levolux.

In July 2026, Alumasc suspended its chief executive Pamela Bingham pending an investigation into her professional conduct.
