= Stuttard =

Stuttard is a surname. Notable people by that name include:

- Ellis Stuttard (1920–1983), English professional association footballer.
- John Stuttard (born 1945), English chartered accountant and Lord Mayor of the City of London in 2006–07.
- David Stuttard, British theatre director, classical scholar, translator, lecturer on classical literature and history, and author.
- Marcus Stuttard, chief executive of the Alternative Investment Market in London.
