= FTSE 100 Index =

British stock market index

FTSE 100

- FTSE 100 month-end closes from January 1984 to 23 October 2026 (logarithmic scale)
- Foundation: 3 January 1984
- Operator: FTSE Russell
- Exchanges: London Stock Exchange
- Trading symbol: UKX
- Constituents: 100 (October 2026)
- Type: Large-cap
- Market cap: £2.517 trillion (September 2026)
- Weighting method: Capitalisation-weighted
- Related indices: FTSE 250 Index; FTSE 350 Index; FTSE SmallCap Index; FTSE All-Share Index; FTSE Fledgling Index; FTSE AIM UK 50 Index
- Website: www.lseg.com/en/ftse-russell/indices/uk
- Reuters: .FTSE
- Bloomberg: UKX:IND

The Financial Times Stock Exchange 100 Index, also called the FTSE 100 Index, FTSE 100, FTSE or, informally, the "Footsie" /ˈfʊtsi/, is the United Kingdom's best-known stock market index and represents the 100 most highly capitalised blue chips listed on the London Stock Exchange.

== History ==
The index started on 3 January 1984, having been constructed by the London Stock Exchange to better reflect activity on the market. The index would replace the Financial Times' own FT 30 after its public unveiling on 14 February. As late as 10 February, the Stock Exchange referred to the index as 'SE 100', cutting out the Financial Times who had not contributed to its construction. Recognition was ultimately given to the fact that having the FT involved in the official launch possessed value.

The new index allowed the Stock Exchange's own London Traded Options Market (LTOM) to launch an options contract derived from the FTSE's real-time data in May 1984, while competitors LIFFE were quick to coincide their launch of the futures contract.

Usage of the index grew, although the tradeable index contracts struggled to gain traction: annual volume on the FTSE futures contract fell short of 89,000 in 1985, pale in comparison to the 15 million lots traded on the S&P 500 index contract. By 1986, Margaret Thatcher's sweeping financial deregulation and high profile privatisations of index members British Telecom, British Gas, and British Aerospace had culminated in the Big Bang. The combination of a new index, major privatisations, LIFFE tradable derivatives, and promotion by the Financial Times led to the FTSE 100 becoming the most widely used indicator of whether the UK stock market was rising or falling.

In 1987, privatisations continued with British Airways and British Petroleum. The latter concluded on the same day as Black Monday, a crash in which the index fell 21.73% in two days; one of those days is still the index's worst single-day return, –12.22%. While the index was in freefall, trading volume of the futures contract hit a record high of 9,111 contracts in a single day. By comparison, the volume in the week preceding the crash averaged 2,400 contracts per day.

By the spring of 1992, LTOM was sold to LIFFE for a nominal sum, consolidating derivatives of the FTSE 100 index into one exchange. Trading of these instruments remained solely in the institutional domain since the significant investment required to deliver electronic trading limited retail access at the time. Nonetheless, annual volumes for 1992 in FTSE futures and options contracts hit a new high of 2.6 million and 2.2 million respectively. In the autumn, the Bank of England directed by HM Treasury under John Major's government failed to prop up sterling to maintain the European Exchange Rate Mechanism. A swift devaluation of sterling on Black Wednesday and exit from the ERM benefitted the globally trading FTSE index constituents enormously as exports became cheaper overnight. Closing on 15 September 1992 at 2,370.0, the index would almost triple by the end of the decade, hitting a high of 6,930.2 on 30 December 1999.

In 2024, there were the most delistings from the London market since the 2008 financial crisis, with companies citing higher valuations and lower costs available by switching to NYSE. Among them Ashtead Group, CRH, and Flutter represented almost £120 billion in FTSE 100 market capitalisation. Takeovers from private equity further reduced the available pool of companies that could be drawn on to populate the index, with Hargreaves Lansdown also set to delist. Across the entire exchange, there were five delistings for every new issue, with speculation at the close of the year around the future of index stalwarts British American Tobacco, Rio Tinto, and Shell.

== Description ==
The index has trading symbol UKX and is maintained by FTSE Russell, a wholly owned subsidiary of London Stock Exchange Group, which originated as a joint venture between the Financial Times and the London Stock Exchange. It is calculated in real time and published every second when the market is open.

The FTSE 100 broadly consists of the largest 100 qualifying UK companies by full market value. The total market value of a company is calculated by multiplying the share price of the company by the total number of shares they have issued. The index therefore only reacts to a change in the market value of the companies, excluding any dividend income an investor may otherwise reinvest. In order to view the effect of both market value performance and income relative to the FTSE 100 Index alone, the FTSE 100 Total Return Index is used. Over the last four decades, the total return index has doubled almost five times whilst the index has doubled slightly more than three times respectively.

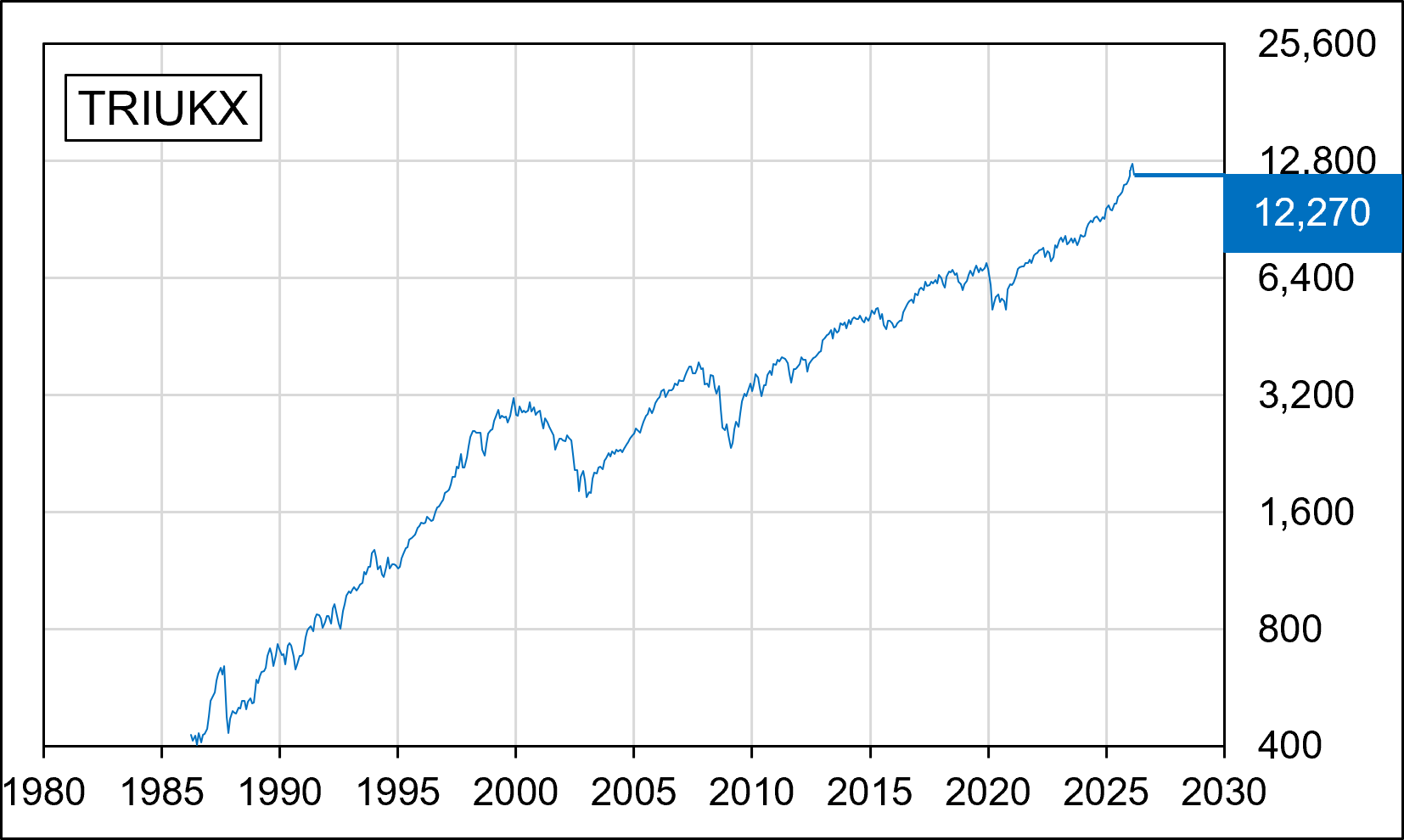
Total return index from 1986 thru 2026

Further, many of these are internationally focused companies: therefore the index's movements are a fairly weak indicator of how the UK economy is faring and are significantly affected by the exchange rates of the pound sterling. A better indication of the UK economy is the FTSE 250 Index, as it contains a smaller proportion of international companies.

Even though the FTSE All-Share Index is more comprehensive, the FTSE 100 is by far the most widely used UK stock market indicator. Other related indices are the FTSE 250 Index (which includes the next largest 250 companies after the FTSE 100), the FTSE 350 Index (which is the aggregation of the FTSE 100 and 250), FTSE SmallCap Index and the FTSE Fledgling Index. The FTSE All-Share aggregates the FTSE 100, FTSE 250 and FTSE SmallCap.

The index consists of 18 ICB Supersectors, four of which had a market capitalisation exceeding £250 billion as of 30 September 2026. These are Banks, Health Care, Energy and Industrial Goods and Services, which together account for approximately 55% of the index's capitalisation. On the same date, there were two companies with a market cap exceeding £200 billion: HSBC and Shell, which together accounted for approximately 18% of the market cap.

ICB Supersector Marketcap to the nearest billion £ sterling as at September 2026
ICB Supersector	Marketcap (£ billion)
Banks	485
Health Care	300
Energy	295
Industrial Goods and Services	294
Basic Resources	201
Personal Care Drug and Grocery Stores	170
Food Beverage and Tobacco	167
Financial Services	134
Utilities	118
Insurance	89
Technology	59
Consumer Products and Services	52
Travel and Leisure	40
Telecommunications	35
Real Estate	29
Retailers	28
Media	18
Chemicals	5

Each calendar quarter, the FTSE's constituents are reviewed and some companies exit or enter the index, resulting in irregular trading volume and price changes as market participants rebalance their portfolios.

=== Weighting ===
In the FTSE indices, share prices are weighted by free-float capitalisation, so that the larger companies, with more of their stock "floating", make more of a difference to the index than smaller companies. The basic formula for these indices is:

$$\begin{align}
\mathrm{Index~value} &= \frac{\mathrm{Total~market~value}}{\mathrm{Index~divisor}}
\end{align}$$

expanded to,

$$\begin{align}
\mathrm{Index~value} &= \frac{\sum_{i=1}^{n} \left ( \mathrm{Price~of~stock}_{i,t}\times\mathrm{Number~of~shares}_{i,t} \times\mathrm{Free~float~factor}_{i,t} \right )}{\mathrm{Index~divisor}}
\end{align}$$

where the sum of the products of the $price$, $shares$, and $FFF$ for each component beginning at $i=1$ through to, usually, $n=100$ at time $t$ are divided by the $index~divisor$ to give the $index~value$.

The free float factor represents the percentage of all issued shares that are readily available for trading; FTSE Russell applies each company's actual free float, and a company must have a free float of at least 10% to be eligible for the index. The free-float capitalisation of a company is its market capitalisation multiplied by its free float adjustment factor. It therefore does not include restricted stocks, such as those held by company insiders.

It follows that the $index~divisor$ at any chosen time, when there are no changes, is derived by rearranging the basic formula to give:

$$\begin{align}
\mathrm{Index~divisor} &= \frac{\mathrm{Total~market~value}}{\mathrm{Index~value}}
\end{align}$$

However, as with any price index the FTSE 100 Index is always changing, whether by corporate action or constituent change. In order to maintain a true reflection of market price movements the $index~divisor$ is adjusted to mitigate any effect these changes have on the index value.

FTSE Russell employs the index formula developed by Hermann Paasche for adjusting the $index~divisor$ for values preceding a corporate action and uses the change in the $index~value$ arising from the adjusted divisor to calculate the new value on the day of the corporate action.

The Paasche formula is given as:

$$\begin{align}
\mathrm{I}_{t}^{Paas} &= \frac{\sum_{i=1}^{n} \mathrm{P}_{i,t}\mathrm{Q}_{i,t}}{\sum_{i=1}^{n}\mathrm{P}_{i,0}\mathrm{Q}_{i,t}}
\end{align}$$

where,

$\mathrm{I}_{t}^{Paas}$	= Paasche Index
$\mathrm{P}_{i,t}$	= price at start of day $t$ for constituent $i$ after adjustments for action or event
$\mathrm{P}_{i,0}$	= price of constituent $i$ on the starting day of calculating the index
$\mathrm{Q}_{i,t}$	= number of shares included in the index for constituent $i$ at the start of day $t$

Since the index is always based on the prior value and not the fixed base value, a Chained Paasche Index is used to chain each new value with the last continuously. This is given by the formula:

$$\begin{align}
\mathrm{I}_{t}^{Paas} &= \mathrm{I}_{t-1}^{Paas} \frac{\sum_{i=1}^{n} \mathrm{P}_{i,t}\mathrm{Q}_{i,t}}{\sum_{i=1}^{n}\mathrm{P}_{i,t-1}\mathrm{Q}_{i,t}}
\end{align}$$

In isolation, the Chained Paasche Index will not adjust the prior closing value, resulting in an abnormal price difference. FTSE Russell utilises a $price~adjustment~factor$ to give continuity, given by the formula:

$$\begin{align}
\mathrm{I}_{t}^{Paas} &= \mathrm{I}_{t-1}^{Paas} \frac{\sum_{i=1}^{n} \mathrm{P}_{i,t}\mathrm{Q}_{i,t}}{\sum_{i=1}^{n}\mathrm{P}_{i,t-1}\mathrm{Q}_{i,t}\mathrm{PAF}_{i,t}}
\end{align}$$

So the $index~value$ or $\mathrm{I}_{t}^{Paas}$ is equal to the product of the previous $index~value$ or $\mathrm{I}_{t-1}^{Paas}$ at time $t-1$, one period before, and the sum of the products of constituents $i$ through $n$'s price $P$ and quantity $Q$ at time $t$ divided by the sum of the products of constituents $i$ through $n$'s price $P$ at time $t-1$ and their quantity $Q$ and their $price~adjustment~factor$ at time $t$.

=== Futures contracts ===
The benchmark FTSE 100 futures contracts are traded on the ICE Futures Europe (ICEU) exchange, formerly the London International Financial Futures Exchange (LIFFE). The value of each contract is 10 GBP × index points and is specified as:

FTSE 100 (Z) contract specifications
Contract size	10 GBP × index points
Exchange	ICEU
Sector	Index
Contract Symbol	Z
Tick size	0.5
Tick value	5 GBP
Basis Point Value	10
Denomination	GBP
Decimal places	1

On the last trading day of each quarterly futures contract, the settlement price is determined using an intraday auction of all FTSE 100 stocks on the London Stock Exchange, starting at 10:15.

== Record values ==
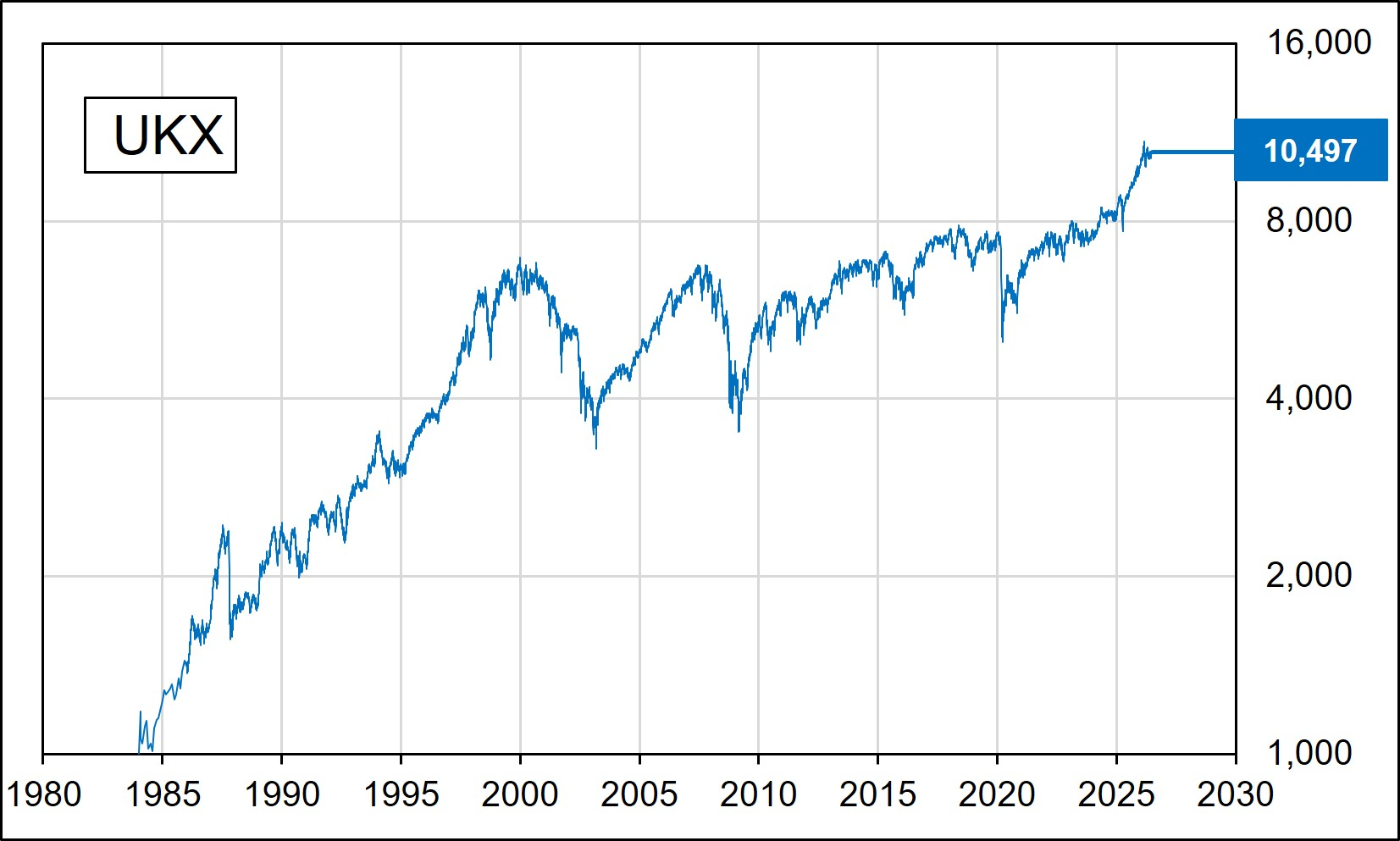
Performance of the FTSE 100 index between January 1984 and June 2026

The index has reached the following record values:

Category	All-time highs	
Closing	10,910.55	27 February 2026
Intraday	10,989.45	31 July 2026

The index began on 3 January 1984 at the base level of 1,000. The highest closing value of 10,910.55 was reached on 27 February 2026 and the highest intraday value of 10,989.45 was reached on 31 July 2026.

== Annual returns ==
The following table shows the annual development of the calculation of the FT 30 Index from 1969 to 1983, and the FTSE 100 since 1984.

Year	Closing level	Change in index	
Year	Closing level	(points)	(%)
1969	313.16		
1970	289.61	−23.55	−7.52
1971	411.03	121.42	41.93
1972	463.72	52.69	12.82
1973	318.30	−145.42	−31.36
1974	142.17	−176.13	−55.33
1975	335.98	193.81	136.32
1976	322.98	−13.00	−3.87
1977	455.96	132.98	41.17
1978	468.06	12.10	2.65
1979	488.40	20.34	4.35
1980	620.60	132.20	27.07
1981	665.50	44.90	7.23
1982	812.37	146.87	22.07
1983	1,000.00	187.63	23.10
1984	1,232.20	232.20	23.22
1985	1,412.60	180.40	14.64
1986	1,679.00	266.40	18.86
1987	1,713.90	34.90	2.08
1988	1,793.10	79.20	4.62
1989	2,422.70	629.60	35.11
1990	2,143.50	−279.20	−11.52
1991	2,493.10	349.60	16.31
1992	2,846.50	353.40	14.18
1993	3,418.40	571.90	20.09
1994	3,065.50	−352.90	−10.32
1995	3,689.30	623.80	20.35
1996	4,118.50	429.20	11.63
1997	5,135.50	1,017.00	24.69
1998	5,882.60	747.10	14.55
1999	6,930.20	1,047.60	17.81
2000	6,222.46	−707.74	−10.21
2001	5,217.35	−1,005.11	−16.15
2002	3,940.36	−1,276.99	−24.48
2003	4,476.87	536.49	13.62
2004	4,814.30	337.57	7.54
2005	5,618.76	804.46	16.71
2006	6,220.81	602.05	10.71
2007	6,456.91	236.10	3.80
2008	4,434.17	−2,022.74	−31.33
2009	5,412.88	978.71	22.07
2010	5,899.94	487.06	9.00
2011	5,572.28	−327.66	−5.55
2012	5,897.81	325.53	5.84
2013	6,749.09	851.29	14.43
2014	6,566.09	−183.00	−2.71
2015	6,242.32	−323.77	−4.93
2016	7,142.83	900.51	14.43
2017	7,687.77	544.94	7.63
2018	6,728.13	−959.64	−12.48
2019	7,542.44	814.31	12.10
2020	6,460.52	−1,081.92	−14.34
2021	7,384.54	924.02	14.30
2022	7,451.74	67.20	0.91
2023	7,733.24	281.50	3.78
2024	8,173.02	439.76	5.69
2025	9,931.38	1,758.36	21.51

== Constituents ==
The following table lists the FTSE 100 companies after the changes on 1 October 2026.

Company	Ticker	ISIN	FTSE industry classification benchmark sector
3i	III	GB00B1YW4409	Investment Banking and Brokerage Services
Aberdeen Group	ABDN	GB00BF8Q6K64	Investment Banking and Brokerage Services
Admiral Group	ADM	GB00B02J6398	Non-life Insurance
Airtel Africa	AAF	GB00BKDRYJ47	Telecommunications Service Providers
Alliance Witan	ALW	GB00B11V7W98	Closed End Investments
Anglo American plc	AAL	GB00BTK05J60	Industrial Metals and Mining
Antofagasta plc	ANTO	GB0000456144	Industrial Metals and Mining
Associated British Foods	ABF	GB0006731235	Food Producers
AstraZeneca	AZN	GB0009895292	Pharmaceuticals, Biotechnology and Marijuana Producers
Autotrader Group	AUTO	GB00BVYVFW23	Software and Computer Services
Aviva	AV	GB00BPQY8M80	Life Insurance
Babcock International	BAB	GB0009697037	Aerospace and Defense
BAE Systems	BA	GB0002634946	Aerospace and Defense
Balfour Beatty	BBY	GB0000961622	Construction and Materials
Barclays	BARC	GB0031348658	Banks
Barratt Redrow	BTRW	GB0000811801	Household Goods and Home Construction
BP	BP	GB0007980591	Non-Renewable Energy
British American Tobacco	BATS	GB0002875804	Tobacco
British Land	BLND	GB0001367019	Real Estate Investment Trusts
BT Group	BT.A	GB0030913577	Telecommunications Service Providers
Bunzl	BNZL	GB00B0744B38	General Industrials
Burberry Group	BRBY	GB0031743007	Personal Goods
Centrica	CNA	GB00B033F229	Gas, Water and Multi-utilities
Coca-Cola Europacific Partners	CCEP	GB00BDCPN049	Beverages
Coca-Cola HBC	CCH	CH0198251305	Beverages
Compass Group	CPG	GB00BD6K4575	Consumer Services
Computacenter	CCC	GB00BV9FP302	Software and Computer Services
Convatec	CTEC	GB00BD3VFW73	Medical Equipment and Services
Croda International	CRDA	GB00BJFFLV09	Chemicals
DCC Energy	DCC	IE0002424939	Industrial Support Services
Diageo	DGE	GB0002374006	Beverages
Diploma	DPLM	GB0001826634	Industrial Support Services
EasyJet	EZJ	GB00B7KR2P84	Travel and Leisure
Endeavour Mining	EDV	GB00BL6K5J42	Precious Metals and Mining
Experian	EXPN	GB00B19NLV48	Industrial Support Services
F & C Investment Trust	FCIT	GB00BS88V647	Closed End Investments
Fresnillo plc	FRES	GB00B2QPKJ12	Precious Metals and Mining
Games Workshop	GAW	GB0003718474	Leisure Goods
Glencore	GLEN	JE00B4T3BW64	Industrial Metals and Mining
GSK plc	GSK	GB00BN7SWP63	Pharmaceuticals, Biotechnology and Marijuana Producers
Haleon	HLN	GB00BMX86B70	Pharmaceuticals, Biotechnology and Marijuana Producers
Halma plc	HLMA	GB0004052071	Electronic and Electrical Equipment
Hiscox	HSX	BMG4593F1389	Non-life Insurance
Howdens Joinery	HWDN	GB0005576813	Retailers
HSBC	HSBA	GB0005405286	Banks
ICG	ICG	GB00BYT1DJ19	Investment Banking and Brokerage Services
IG Group	IGG	GB00B06QFB75	Investment Banking and Brokerage Services
IHG Hotels & Resorts	IHG	GB00BHJYC057	Travel and Leisure
IMI	IMI	GB00BGLP8L22	Electronic and Electrical Equipment
Imperial Brands	IMB	GB0004544929	Tobacco
Informa	INF	GB00BMJ6DW54	Media
International Airlines Group	IAG	ES0177542018	Travel and Leisure
Intertek	ITRK	GB0031638363	Industrial Support Services
Investec	INVP	GB00B17BBQ50	Banks
Ithaca Energy	ITH	GB00BPJHV584	Non-Renewable Energy
JD Sports	JD	GB00BM8Q5M07	Retailers
Lion Finance Group	BGEO	GB00BF4HYT85	Banks
Kingfisher plc	KGF	GB0033195214	Retailers
Land Securities	LAND	GB00BYW0PQ60	Real Estate Investment Trusts
Legal & General	LGEN	GB0005603997	Life Insurance
Lloyds Banking Group	LLOY	GB0008706128	Banks
LondonMetric Property	LMP	GB00B4WFW713	Real Estate Investment Trusts
London Stock Exchange Group	LSEG	GB00B0SWJX34	Finance and Credit Services
M&G	MNG	GB00BKFB1C65	Investment Banking and Brokerage Services
Marks & Spencer	MKS	GB0031274896	Personal Care, Drug and Grocery Stores
Melrose Industries	MRO	GB00BNGDN821	Aerospace and Defense
Metlen Energy & Metals	MTLN	GB00BTQGS779	Gas, Water and Multi-utilities
National Grid plc	NG	GB00BDR05C01	Gas, Water and Multi-utilities
NatWest Group	NWG	GB00BM8PJY71	Banks
Next plc	NXT	GB0032089863	Retailers
Pearson plc	PSON	GB0006776081	Media
Pershing Square Holdings	PSH	GG00BPFJTF46	Closed End Investments
Polar Capital Technology Trust	PCT	GB00BR3YV268	Closed End Investments
Prudential plc	PRU	GB0007099541	Life Insurance
Reckitt	RKT	GB00BSZBP530	Personal Care, Drug and Grocery Stores
RELX	REL	GB00B2B0DG97	Software and Computer Services
Rentokil Initial	RTO	GB00B082RF11	Industrial Support Services
Rio Tinto	RIO	GB0007188757	Industrial Metals and Mining
Rolls-Royce Holdings	RR	GB00B63H8491	Aerospace and Defense
Sage Group	SGE	GB00B8C3BL03	Software and Computer Services
Sainsbury's	SBRY	GB00B019KW72	Personal Care, Drug and Grocery Stores
Scottish Mortgage Investment Trust	SMT	GB00BLDYK618	Closed End Investments
Segro	SGRO	GB00B5ZN1N88	Real Estate Investment Trusts
Severn Trent	SVT	GB00B1FH8J72	Gas, Water and Multi-utilities
Shell plc	SHEL	GB00BP6MXD84	Non-Renewable Energy
Smiths Group	SMIN	GB00B1WY2338	General Industrials
Smith & Nephew	SN	GB0009223206	Medical Equipment and Services
Spirax Group	SPX	GB00BWFGQN14	Industrial Engineering
SSE plc	SSE	GB0007908733	Electricity
Standard Chartered	STAN	GB0004082847	Banks
Standard Life	SDLF	GB00BGXQNP29	Life Insurance
St. James's Place	STJ	GB0007669376	Investment Banking and Brokerage Services
Tesco	TSCO	GB00BLGZ9862	Personal Care, Drug and Grocery Stores
Tritax Big Box REIT	BBOX	GB00BG49KP99	Real Estate Investment Trusts
Unilever	ULVR	GB00BVZK7T90	Personal Care, Drug and Grocery Stores
United Utilities	UU	GB00B39J2M42	Gas, Water and Multi-utilities
Vodafone Group	VOD	GB00BH4HKS39	Telecommunications Service Providers
Weir	WEIR	GB0009465807	Industrial Engineering
Whitbread	WTB	GB00B1KJJ408	Travel and Leisure
WPP	WPP	JE00B8KF9B49	Media

== Past constituents ==
All changes to the index's constituents are due to market capitalisation unless noted otherwise.

- Abrdn
- Abbey Life (became subsidiary of Lloyds TSB in 1996, then sold to Deutsche Bank in 2007)
- Abbey National (acquired by Banco Santander Central Hispano, now part of its Santander UK subsidiary)
- Aberdeen Asset Management
- African Barrick Gold
- Aggreko
- Alliance & Leicester (acquired by Banco Santander Central Hispano, now part of its Santander UK subsidiary)
- Alliance Boots (acquired by private equity fund controlled by Kohlberg Kravis Roberts)
- Alliance Trust
- Allied Domecq (acquired by Pernod Ricard)
- Allied Zurich (dual holding company along with Zurich Allied, companies unified in 2000 to form Zurich Financial Services)
- Amec
- Amersham (acquired by GE, now part of its GE Healthcare division)
- Amstrad (acquired by British Sky Broadcasting)
- Argos (acquired by GUS)
- Argyll Group (renamed Safeway in 1996, then taken over by Morrisons in 2004)
- Arjo Wiggins Appleton (acquired by Worms & Cie)
- ARM Holdings (acquired by SoftBank Group)
- ASDA Group (acquired by Wal-Mart)
- Ashtead Group (transfer of listing to the US)
- Avast (acquired by NortonLifeLock)
- Aveva (acquired by Schneider Electric)
- BAA (acquired by Ferrovial)
- Baltimore Technologies (acquired by Oryx International Growth Fund)
- Bank of Scotland (merged with Halifax to form HBOS, now part of the Lloyds Banking Group)
- Bass (became Six Continents and then InterContinental Hotels Group)
- Beazley (acquired by Zurich Insurance Group)
- Beecham Group (merged with SmithKline and then with Glaxo to become GlaxoSmithKline)
- Berisford (renamed Enodis, subsequently acquired by The Manitowoc Company)
- Berkeley Group Holdings
- BET, formerly British Electric Traction (acquired by Rentokil)
- BG Group (acquired by Royal Dutch Shell)
- BHP (moved main stock listing to the Australian Securities Exchange)
- BICC (renamed Balfour Beatty)
- British Land
- Blue Arrow (acquired by Corporate Services Group)
- Blue Circle Industries (acquired by Lafarge)
- BOC (acquired by Linde)
- Bowater (renamed Rexam)
- Bookham Technology (renamed Oclaro and now traded on Nasdaq)
- B&M
- BPB Industries (acquired by Saint-Gobain)
- Bradford & Bingley (branch network acquired by Banco Santander Central Hispano, now part of its Santander UK subsidiary; loans book nationalised)
- Brambles Industries (now only listed on the Australian Securities Exchange)
- British Aerospace (merged with Marconi Electronic Systems to form BAE Systems)
- British Airways (merged with Iberia to form International Airlines Group)
- British Home Stores (acquired by Storehouse and then sold to Philip Green)
- British Steel (merged with Koninklijke Hoogovens to become Corus Group, now Tata Steel Europe)
- British & Commonwealth (collapsed in 1990)
- Britoil (acquired by BP)
- BTR (merged with Siebe to form BTR Siebe, subsequently renamed Invensys)
- Burmah Oil (renamed Burmah Castrol and acquired by BP)
- Burton Group (renamed Arcadia and acquired by Philip Green)
- Cable & Wireless Worldwide (acquired by Vodafone)
- Cadbury (acquired by Kraft Foods)
- Cairn Energy
- Capita
- Carlton Communications (merged with Granada to form ITV)
- Carnival Corporation
- Carphone Warehouse
- Celltech (acquired by UCB in 2004)
- CMG (merged with Logica to form LogicaCMG)
- Coats Viyella (acquired by Guinness Peat Group and renamed Coats)
- Cobham
- Colt Group
- Commercial Union Assurance (merged with General Accident to form CGU, itself now part of Aviva)
- Consolidated Gold Fields (acquired by Hanson)
- Cookson Group
- Corus Group (acquired by Tata Steel, now forming its Tata Steel Europe division)
- Courtaulds (demerged into two businesses acquired by Sara Lee and Akzo Nobel)
- CRH moved primary listing to New York
- Daily Mail and General Trust
- Dalgety (renamed PIC International and then Sygen International and subsequently acquired by Genus)
- Darktrace (acquired by Thoma Bravo)
- Debenhams
- Dechra Pharmaceuticals (acquired by EQT AB)
- De La Rue
- Dimension Data Holdings (market capitalisation fell too low, subsequently acquired by Nippon Telegraph and Telephone)
- Direct Line Group
- Distillers (acquired by Guinness and now part of Diageo)
- Dixons Carphone
- Dixons Group (renamed to DSG International and then Dixons Retail; market capitalisation also fell too low)
- Dowty Group (acquired by TI Group, itself now part of Smiths Group)
- DSG International (renamed Dixons Retail; market capitalisation also fell too low)
- Eagle Star (acquired by BAT Industries and then demerged as part of Zurich Financial Services)
- Eastern Group (acquired by Hanson, renamed The Energy Group; acquired by Texas Utilities)
- ECC Group (acquired by Imetal)
- Edinburgh Investment Trust
- Electrocomponents
- EMAP (acquired by Apax Partners and the Guardian Media Group)
- EMI Group (acquired by Terra Firma Capital Partners, now owned by Citigroup)
- Energis (acquired by Cable and Wireless)
- Entain
- Enterprise Inns
- Enterprise Oil (acquired by Royal Dutch Shell)
- Essar Energy
- Eurasian Natural Resources Corporation
- Eurotunnel
- Evraz
- Exco International (acquired by British & Commonwealth Holdings)
- Exel (acquired by Deutsche Post)
- Ferguson (moved main listing to New York Stock Exchange)
- Ferranti International (collapsed in 1993)
- Ferrexpo
- FirstGroup
- Fisons (acquired by Rhone-Poulenc Rorer, now Sanofi-Aventis)
- Flutter Entertainment (moved listing to New York Stock Exchange)
- Forte (acquired by Granada, now ITV)
- Frasers Group
- Freeserve (acquired by France Télécom, now Orange)
- Friends Life (acquired by Aviva)
- Friends Provident (acquired by Friends Life Group)
- G4S
- Gallaher Group (acquired by Japan Tobacco)
- Gateway Corporation (renamed Somerfield, subsequently acquired by The Co-operative Group)
- GEC, formerly General Electric Company (renamed Marconi, broken up, remnant renamed Telent)
- General Accident (merged with Commercial Union to form CGU, itself now part of Aviva)
- George Wimpey (merged with Taylor Woodrow to form Taylor Wimpey)
- Glaxo Wellcome (merged with SmithKline Beecham to form GlaxoSmithKline)
- Globe Investment Trust (acquired by British Coal Pension Fund)
- Granada Compass (split in 2001 to leave Granada and Compass Group)
- Granada (merged with Carlton Communications to form ITV)
- Greenall's Group (renamed De Vere Group and then acquired by a joint venture of private investors)
- Grand Metropolitan (merged with Guinness to form Diageo)
- Guardian Royal Exchange (acquired by Axa)
- Guinness (merged with Grand Metropolitan to form Diageo)
- GUS (now demerged into Home Retail Group and Experian)
- GVC Holdings (changed its name to Entain plc)
- Habitat Mothercare (merged with British Home Stores to form Storehouse and subsequently renamed Mothercare again)
- Halifax Group (merged with the Bank of Scotland to form HBOS)
- Hambro Life (renamed Allied Dunbar and acquired by BAT Industries and then demerged as part of Zurich Financial Services)
- Hammerson
- Hanson (acquired by Heidelberg Cement)
- Harbour Energy
- Hargreaves Lansdown (acquired by CVC Capital Partners, Nordic Capital and the Abu Dhabi Investment Authority)
- Harrisons & Crosfield (renamed Elementis)
- Hawker Siddeley (acquired by BTR, now Invensys)
- Hays
- HBOS Group plc (acquired by Lloyds Banking Group)
- Hikma Pharmaceuticals
- Hillsdown Holdings (acquired by Hicks, Muse, Tate and Furst and then sold on as Premier Foods)
- Home Retail Group
- Homeserve (acquired by Brookfield Asset Management)
- House of Fraser (acquired by Baugur)
- ICAP
- Imperial Chemical Industries (acquired by Akzo Nobel)
- Imperial Continental Gas Association (broke up into Calor and Contibel)
- Inchcape
- Inmarsat
- Innogy Holdings (renamed Npower and acquired by RWE)
- International Power (acquired by GDF Suez)
- Intu
- Invensys
- Invesco (moved primary listing to NYSE)
- ITV
- Jaguar (acquired by Ford and then by Tata Motors)
- Johnson Matthey
- Just Eat Takeaway (nationality reassigned to the Netherlands)
- Kazakhmys
- Kelda Group (acquired by Saltaire Water consortium) a consortium of investment companies including Citigroup and HSBC.
- Kingston Communications (renamed KCOM Group and market capitalisation fell too low)
- Kwik Save Group (merged with Somerfield)
- Ladbrokes
- Laporte (major divisions acquired by Kohlberg Kravis Roberts)
- Lasmo (acquired by Eni)
- Lattice Group (merged with National Grid to form National Grid Transco)
- Lever Brothers (merged with Margarine Unie to form Unilever)
- Logica
- London Electricity (acquired by Électricité de France, now part of its EDF Energy division)
- Lonhro (renamed Lonmin)
- Lonmin
- Lucas Industries (merged with Varity to form LucasVarity, then acquired by TRW)
- LucasVarity (acquired by TRW)
- Magnet and Southerns (acquired by Berisford)
- Man Group
- Maxwell Communications Corporation (collapsed in 1991)
- MB-Caradon (renamed Caradon and then Novar, then acquired by Honeywell)
- Mediclinic International
- Meggitt (acquired by Parker Hannifin)
- MEPC (acquired by Leconport Estates)
- Mercury Asset Management (acquired by Merrill Lynch)
- Merlin Entertainments
- MFI (renamed Galiform and then Howden Joinery and market capitalisation fell too low)
- Micro Focus International
- Midlands Electricity (acquired by Acquila Sterling, now part of E.ON Energy UK)
- Midland Bank (acquired by HSBC)
- Misys
- Mitchells & Butlers
- Mondi
- Morrisons (acquired by Clayton, Dubilier & Rice)
- National Westminster Bank (acquired by Royal Bank of Scotland Group)
- NFC (merged with Ocean Group to form Exel, now part of Deutsche Post)
- NMC Health (listing suspended)
- Northern Foods (market capitalisation fell too low, before being acquired by Ranjit Boparan)
- Northern Rock (market capitalisation fell too low, before being nationalised)
- Norwich Union (merged with CGU to form CGNU, now Aviva)
- Nycomed Amersham (acquired by GE)
- O2 (renamed Telefónica Europe following acquisition by Telefónica)
- Ocado
- Old Mutual (managed separation of the business)
- Orange (acquired by Mannesmann and then by France Télécom, now Orange)
- PartyGaming (market capitalisation fell too low, before merging with Bwin to become bwin.party digital entertainment)
- P&O (acquired by Dubai Ports World)
- P&O Princess Cruises (merged with Carnival Corporation and re-listed as Carnival Corporation & plc)
- Pennon Group
- Persimmon
- Petrofac
- Pilkington (acquired by Nippon Sheet Glass)
- Plessey (acquired by GEC and Siemens)
- Polly Peck (collapsed in 1990)
- Polymetal International
- PowerGen (acquired by E.ON Energy UK)
- Provident Financial
- Psion
- Punch Taverns
- Racal Electronics (acquired by Thomson-CSF and then Thales Group)
- Railtrack (collapsed in 2001)
- Randgold Resources (merged with Barrick Gold Corp)
- Rank Hovis McDougall (acquired by Premier Foods)
- Reckitt & Colman (merged with Benckiser to form Reckitt Benckiser)
- Redland (acquired by Lafarge)
- Reed International (merged with Elsevier to form Reed Elsevier)
- Renishaw
- Rentokil Initial
- Resolution Limited (changed its name to Friends Life Group)
- Resolution plc (acquired by Pearl Group)
- Rexam (acquired by Ball Corporation)
- Rightmove
- RMC Group (acquired by Cemex)
- Rothmans International (acquired by British American Tobacco)
- J Rothschild (renamed St. James's Place and market capitalisation fell too low)
- Rowntree's (acquired by Nestlé)
- Royal Insurance (merged with Sun Alliance Group to form Royal & SunAlliance)
- Royal Mail
- RS Group
- RSA Insurance Group (acquired by Danish insurer Tryg and Canada's Intact Financial Corporation in May 2021).
- Saatchi & Saatchi (acquired by Publicis)
- Safeway (acquired by Morrisons)
- SABMiller (acquired by Anheuser-Busch InBev)
- Schroders (acquired by Nuveen)
- Scottish & Newcastle (acquired by a consortium formed of Heineken & Carlsberg)
- Scottish Hydro Electric (merged with Southern Electric to form Scottish and Southern Energy)
- ScottishPower (acquired by Iberdrola)
- Sears (acquired by January Investments – itself controlled by Philip Green)
- Securicor (merged with Group 4 Falck to form G4S)
- Sedgwick (acquired by Marsh & McLennan)
- Sema Group (acquired by Schlumberger)
- Serco
- Shell Transport and Trading Company (later re-organised with Royal Dutch Petroleum Company as Royal Dutch Shell and then renamed Shell plc)
- Shire (acquired by Takeda Pharmaceutical Company)
- Siebe (merged with BTR to form Invensys)
- Sky (acquired by Comcast)
- SmithKline Beecham (merged with Glaxo Wellcome to form GlaxoSmithKline)
- DS Smith (acquired by International Paper)
- Smiths Industries (renamed to Smiths Group)
- Smurfit Kappa (merged with WestRock to form Smurfit WestRock)
- Southern Electric (merged with Scottish Hydro Electric to form Scottish and Southern Energy)
- Spirent
- Sports Direct
- Stagecoach Group
- Standard Telephones and Cables (renamed STC and acquired by Nortel)
- Storehouse (renamed Mothercare)
- Sun Alliance Group (merged with Royal Insurance to form Royal & Sun Alliance)
- Sun Life Assurance (acquired by Axa)
- Sun Life & Provincial Holdings (acquired by Axa)
- Tarmac (acquired by Anglo American)
- Tate & Lyle
- Taylor Wimpey
- Taylor Woodrow (merged with George Wimpey to form Taylor Wimpey)
- Telewest Communications (merged with NTL to form NTL:Telewest now Virgin Media)
- Thames Water (acquired by RWE and then sold to Macquarie Group)
- The Energy Group (acquired by Texas Utilities)
- Thomas Cook Group
- Thomson Reuters (delisted shares from the London Stock Exchange as it ceased to be a dual-listed company)
- Thorn (acquired by Nomura Group)
- Thorn EMI (renamed EMI Group and then acquired by Terra Firma Capital Partners)
- Thus (market capitalisation fell too low, subsequently acquired by Cable & Wireless Worldwide)
- TI Group (acquired by Smiths Group)
- Tomkins (acquired by Onex Corporation and Canada Pension Plan Investment Board)
- Trafalgar House (acquired by Kværner)
- Travis Perkins
- TSB Group (merged with Lloyds Bank to form Lloyds TSB)
- Trusthouse Forte (acquired by Granada)
- TUI Group
- TUI Travel (merged with its German parent to form the TUI Group)
- Tullow Oil
- Ultramar (acquired by Lasmo and now part of Eni)
- Unigate (renamed Uniq, then market capitalisation fell too low)
- United Biscuits (acquired by consortium of financial investors)
- United Business Media
- Unite Group
- Vedanta Resources
- Vistry Group
- Warburg SG (acquired by Swiss Bank Corporation, now part of UBS)
- Wellcome (merged with Glaxo to form Glaxo Wellcome, then with SmithKline Beecham to form GlaxoSmithKline)
- WH Smith
- William Hill
- Williams Holdings (demerged into Kidde and Chubb Fire & Security, both now part of United Technologies)
- Willis Corroon (acquired by Trinity Acquisition on behalf of Kohlberg Kravis Roberts and renamed Willis Group)
- Willis Faber (acquired by Trinity Acquisition on behalf of Kohlberg Kravis Roberts and renamed Willis Coroon and then Willis Group)
- Wood Group
- Worldpay (acquired by Vantiv)
- Woolwich (acquired by Barclays)
- Yell Group
- Zeneca (merged with Astra to form AstraZeneca)

Source: "FTSE: FTSE 100 Constituent Changes" (PDF; 57.9 KB)

== FT 30 ==
The oldest continuous index in the UK is the FT 30, also known as the Financial Times Index or the FT Ordinary Index (FTOI). It was established in 1935 and nowadays is largely obsolete due to its redundancy. It is similar to the Dow Jones Industrial Average, and companies listed are from the industrial and commercial sectors. Financial sector companies and government stocks are excluded.

Of the original constituents, three are currently in the FTSE 100: Tate & Lyle, Imperial Tobacco and Rolls-Royce, although Rolls-Royce has not been continuously listed and Imperial Tobacco was a subsidiary of Hanson for a number of years, and is now renamed as Imperial Brands. Only one of the original FT 30 companies is still in that index: Tate & Lyle (membership is not strictly based on market capitalisation, so this does not mean they are necessarily among the top thirty companies in the FTSE 100). The best performer from the original lineup has been Imperial Tobacco.

== See also ==
Other lists

- List of corporate collapses and scandals, on major bankruptcies historically and worldwide
- List of hedge funds
- List of largest companies by revenue, worldwide
- List of largest companies in the United Kingdom
- List of largest United Kingdom employers, including the public sector
- List of private-equity firms

Stock market lists

- AEX index
- Dow Jones Industrial Average and the DAX 30, equivalent to the FT 30 in the US and Germany
- Financial Times Global 500, the BBC Global 30 and the Fortune Global 500, list the world's largest corporations by market capitalisation
- FTSE 250 and FTSE techMARK 100, a longer FT list, and one for the "new economy"
- List of European stock exchanges
- List of stock exchanges
- List of stock market indices
- S&P 100 and the HDAX, top 100 in the US and top 110 in Germany
