= FJV =

FJV or fjv can refer to:

- Fidelity Japanese Values, a British investment trust, by stock ticker
- Rapateaceae, a family of flowering plants, by Catalogue of Life identifier
- Former Jesuit Volunteers, or people who formerly served in the Jesuit Volunteer Corps
- fjv, a file format produced by Fjölnir (programming language)

== See also ==
- Francis J. Vassallo & Associates Ltd (FJVA), a corporate services provider founded by Maltese economist Francis J. Vassallo
