= MWY =

MWY may refer to:

- mewithoutYou, American rock band
- Mid Wynd International Investment Trust (LSE: MWY), a publicly traded investment trust listed on the London Stock Exchange
- Midway Games, a defunct video game developer and publisher whose stock ticker symbol was MWY
- Mount Waverley railway station (Station code: MWY), Victoria, Australia
