= Legend Natural Gas =

Independent oil and gas company

- Type: Private Partnership
- Industry: Independent Oil & Gas
- Founded: 2001
- Headquarters: Katy, TX
- Key people: James A. Winne III, Founder; Michael Becci, Founder
- Revenue: ± 300 MM
- Total assets: US$ ~2 billion (2011)
- Number of employees: 50–100
- Website: http://www.lng2.com

Legend Natural Gas is an independent oil and gas company headquartered in the Houston area. Legend Production Holdings LLC, is focused on acquiring and developing long-lived oil and natural gas properties primarily in prolific basins around Texas, including areas of South Texas, the Fort Worth Basin (Barnett Shale) and the Permian Basin.

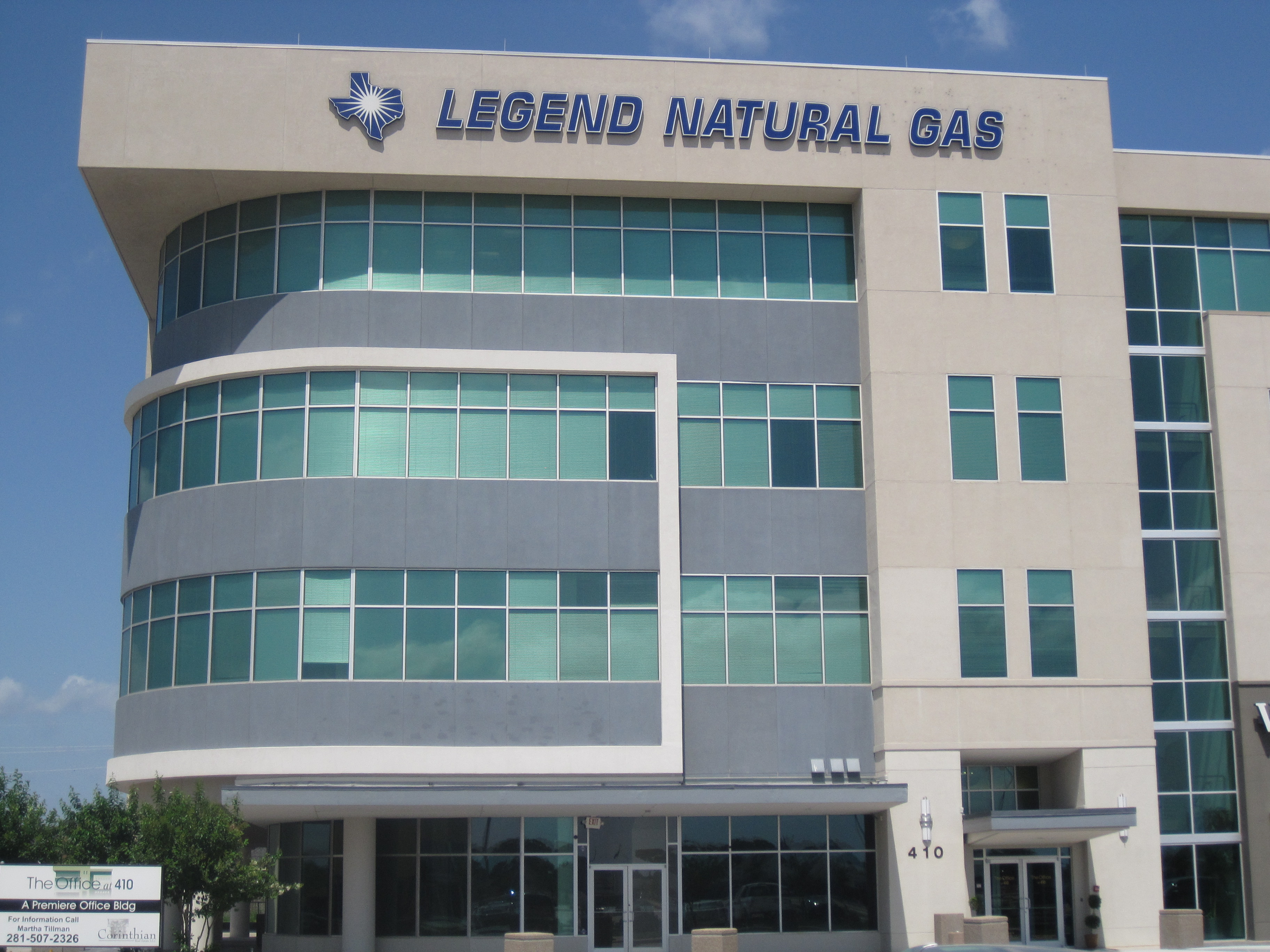
Legend Natural Gas Headquarters, Katy, TX

Legend Production Holdings, LLC predecessor, Legend Natural Gas LP, was formed in 2001 by James A. Winne III and Michael Becci, serving as President and CEO and Vice President and CFO, respectively. It was the first portfolio company funded by Riverstone/Carlyle Global Energy and Power Funds in the exploration and production sector. The partnership acquired and developed producing properties in South Texas until the sale of its assets to Chesapeake Energy in 2004. Legend Natural Gas II, LP was then formed in 2004 followed by the formation of Legend Natural Gas III, LP in 2006 and Legend Natural Gas IV, LP in 2009. These Legend partnerships continue today as Legend Production under the same experienced management team led by James A. Winne III and Michael Becci. The relationship between Legend and Riverstone is the longest of any Riverstone portfolio company. Riverstone has invested approximately $1 billion in upstream assets through the various Legend partnerships.

== Background ==
Legend was formed using a series of limited partnerships sponsored by two private equity firms, Riverstone Holdings, LLC and the Carlyle Group. Currently, Legend consists of three partnerships with approximately $450 million of equity invested and $110 million of outstanding bank debt. Legend's combined proved reserves at December 31, 2010 are approximately 250 Bcfe (60% gas and 40% oil) and the current net production is approximately 65,000 Mcfe per day. Legend's operating cash flow is approximately $10 million per month. The Legend management team has been operating in south Texas for over 20 years and, since 2000, has been involved with approximately $2.0 billion of oil and gas property acquisitions and divestures. Legend Natural Gas III, LP ("LNG III") and Legend Natural Gas IV, LP ("LNG IV") are the proposed acquirers of the oil and gas assets in Santa Fe Field, Brooks County, Texas. Currently, LNG III has $281 million in producing oil and gas assets, producing 65 mmcfe per day. LNG IV has $25.0 million of oil and gas leasehold interests and a $400 million commitment from its private equity fund sponsors. LNG III would acquire 1/3 of Smith Production's interest in the Santa Fe Field and LNG IV would acquire the remaining 2/3 interest. LNG III would be the designated operator.

== Acquisition from Range Resources ==
The Barnett assets acquired from Range include 390 producing wells and approximately 52,000 net acres, 80% of which are located in the prolific core area of the Barnett Shale. Daily net production from the properties was 113 Mmcfe per day (86% gas) as of February 1, 2011, the effective date of the purchase. The acquisition marks Legend's entry into the horizontal Barnett Shale resource play, making it the fifth largest producer in the play. Legend is the operator of the newly acquired properties.
