= Polar Capital Global Financials Trust =

British investment trust

- Type: Public
- Traded as: LSE: PCFT
- Industry: Investment
- Headquarters: London, UK
- Key people: Simon Corderey (Chairperson)
- Website: www.polarcapitalglobalfinancialstrust.com

Polar Capital Global Financials Trust plc (LSE: PCFT), is a large British investment trust predominantly focused on investments in the financial services sector i.e. banks, asset managers, stock exchanges and online payment businesses. It is managed by Polar Capital and the chair is Simon Corderey. Established in 2013, it is listed on the London Stock Exchange.

== See also ==
- Polar Capital Technology Trust
