= Smiths News =

English media distribution company

Smiths News PLC
- Formerly: Smiths News PLC
- Type: PLC
- Traded as: LSE: SNWS
- Industry: Distribution
- Founded: 2006
- Headquarters: Swindon, United Kingdom
- Key people: David Blackwood, (Chairman); Jonathan Bunting, (CEO)
- Products: Newspapers and magazines, consumables, books
- Brands: WHSmith News, WHSmith Travel
- Services: Books, stationery, newspapers, convenience food
- Revenue: ▼£1,036.2 million (2026)
- Operating income: ▼£38.7 million (2026)
- Net income: ▼£24.4 million (2026)
- Website: www.smithsnews.co.uk

Smiths News is a distributor of newspapers, magazines, books and consumables, headquartered in Swindon, England. It is a constituent of the FTSE SmallCap Index

== History ==
The company, originally established as "WHSmith News", was renamed Smiths News PLC on its demerger from WHSmith on 1 September 2006.

In April 2014, the company rebranded as Connect Group PLC to reflect the diversity of the company's markets.

The company purchased Tuffnells Parcels Express for more than £100m in November 2014 but, after several years of poor performance under the group's stewardship, sold it for £15m in April 2020.

In October 2020 Connect Group PLC changed its name back to Smiths News PLC.
