= Warehouse REIT =

British property company

- Company type: Public limited company
- Traded as: LSE: WHR
- Industry: Property
- Founded: 2013; 13 years ago
- Headquarters: London, United Kingdom
- Key people: Neil Kirton (chairman)
- Revenue: ▼£47.2 million (2024)
- Operating income: ▲£55.6 million (2024)
- Net income: ▲£34.3 million (2024)
- Website: www.warehousereit.co.uk

Warehouse REIT is a property company which invests in the provision of warehousing. The company was listed on the London Stock Exchange until it was acquired by Blackstone in September 2025.

== History ==
The company was established by Tilstone Partners in June 2013 and was launched on the Alternative Investment Market in September 2017 raising £150 million.

It went on to buy a portfolio of 51 warehouses from Hansteen Holdings for £116 million in February 2018.

In April 2019, it bought a warehouse in Northampton, let to the John Lewis Partnership, and a warehouse in Aberdeen, let to various tenants, for £37 million.

In July 2020, it raised a further £150 million and immediately began deploying the proceeds on the purchase of further warehouses.

In September 2020, the company acquired an Amazon Fulfilment Centre in Chesterfield from Tritax Big Box REIT for £57 million.

The company raised a further £46 million in February 2021 and used some of the money raised to buy two warehouses in Harlow.

The company moved to the main market of the London Stock Exchange in July 2022.

In September 2025 investment company Blackstone acquired a controlling stake of Warehouse REIT, after its £489m all-cash offer was accepted by over 51% of shareholders.

== Operations ==
The company specialises in warehousing. It is managed by Tilstone Partners and lets the properties to logistics and retail businesses. Its main tenants include Amazon, the John Lewis Partnership and DFS Furniture. Its portfolio was valued at £0.8 billion as at 31 March 2023.
