= FTSE All-Share Index =

British stock market index

FTSE All-Share

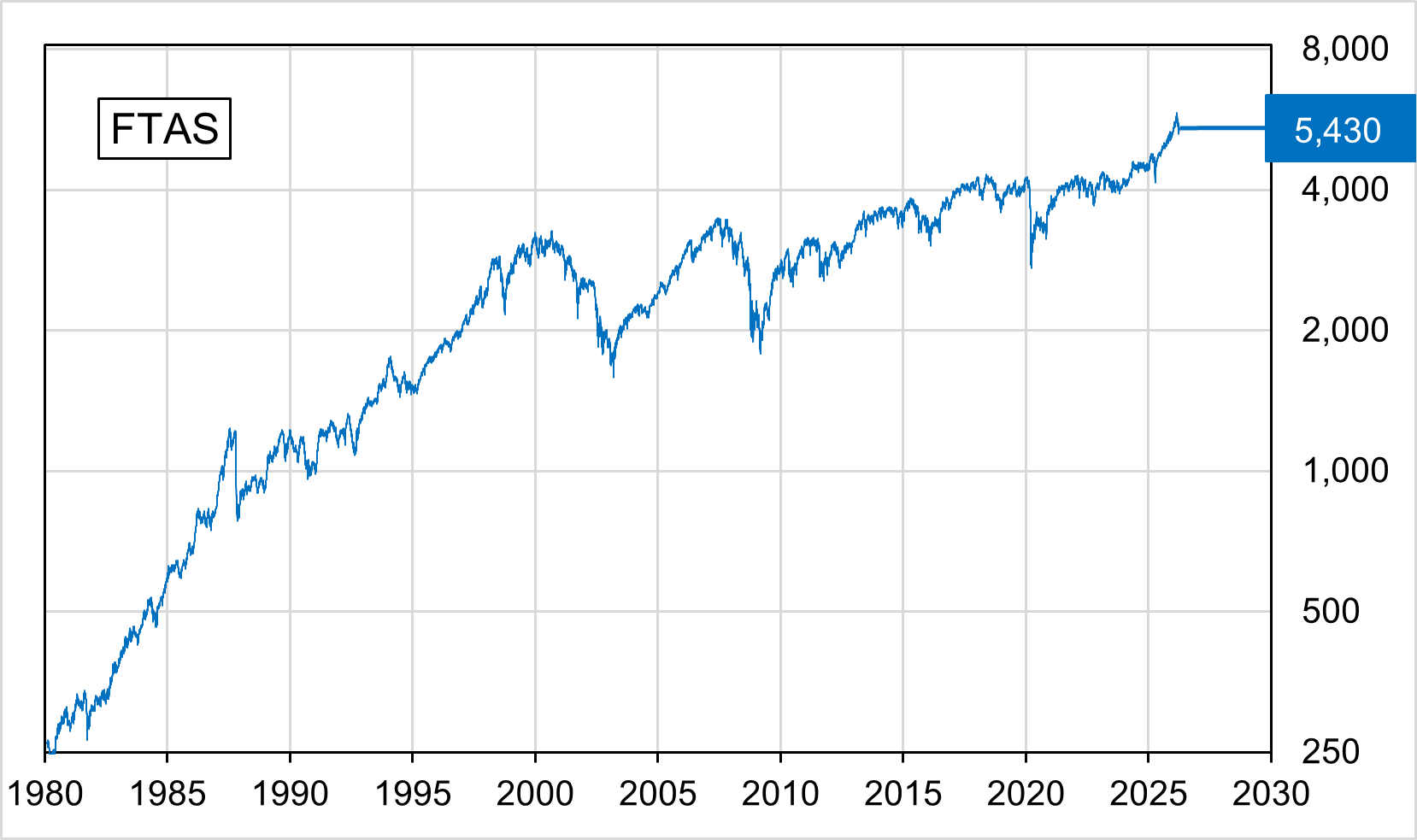
- Performance of the FTSE All-Share index from 1980 to 2026
- Foundation: 10 April 1962
- Operator: FTSE Russell
- Exchanges: London Stock Exchange
- Trading symbol: ASX
- Constituents: 532 (March 2026)
- Type: Large-cap
- Market cap: £2.744 trillion (March 2026)
- Weighting method: Capitalisation-weighted
- Related indices: FTSE 100 Index; FTSE 250 Index; FTSE 350 Index; FTSE SmallCap Index; FTSE Fledgling Index; FTSE AIM UK 50 Index
- Website: www.lseg.com/en/ftse-russell/indices/uk
- Reuters: .FTAS
- Bloomberg: ASX:IND

The FTSE All-Share Index, originally known as the FTSE Actuaries All Share Index, is a capitalisation-weighted index, comprising around 600 of more than 2,000 companies traded on the London Stock Exchange (LSE). By weighting companies based on their market capitalisation, the index ensures that companies with larger market capitalisations have a greater influence on the index's performance. Since 29 December 2017 the constituents of this index totaled 641 companies. The FTSE All-Share is the aggregation of the FTSE 100 Index and the FTSE 250 Index, which are together known as the FTSE 350 Index, and the FTSE SmallCap Index. The index is maintained by FTSE Russell, a subsidiary of the London Stock Exchange Group. It aims to represent at least 98% of the full capital value of all UK companies that qualify as eligible for inclusion.

The index base date is 10 April 1962 with a base level of 100.

The index consists of 11 ICB sectors, five of which had a market capitalisation exceeding £300 billion as of 31 March 2026. These are Financials, Industrials, Consumer Staples, Health Care, and Energy which together account for approximately 76% of the index's capitalisation. On the same date, there were three companies with a market cap exceeding £200 billion: AstraZeneca, HSBC and Shell, which together accounted for approximately 23% of the market cap.

Each calendar quarter, the FTSE All-Share's constituents are reviewed and some companies exit or enter the index, resulting in irregular trading volume and price changes as market participants rebalance their portfolios.

Market cap weights for the three component indices as at March 2026
1. FTSE 100 (87.0%)
2. FTSE 250 (11.0%)
3. FTSE SmallCap (2.00%)

== See also ==
- FTSE 100
- FTSE 250
