= The Gym Group =

Chain of UK fitness clubs

The Gym Group plc
- Type: Public limited company
- Traded as: LSE: GYM; FTSE SmallCap Component
- ISIN: GB00BZBX0P70
- Founded: 2007; 19 years ago
- Founder: John Treharne
- Headquarters: Clapham, London,
- Key people: John Trehane (Chairman); Will Orr (Chief executive officer); Luke Tait (Chief financial officer)
- Revenue: ▲£244.9 million (2025)
- Operating income: ▲£31.0 million (2025)
- Net income: ▲£7.4 million (2025)
- Website: www.thegymgroup.com Corporate Site

former logo

The Gym Group is a chain of 24/7 no contract fitness clubs in the United Kingdom. The company is headquartered on St. John's Road in Clapham, London, England.

== History ==
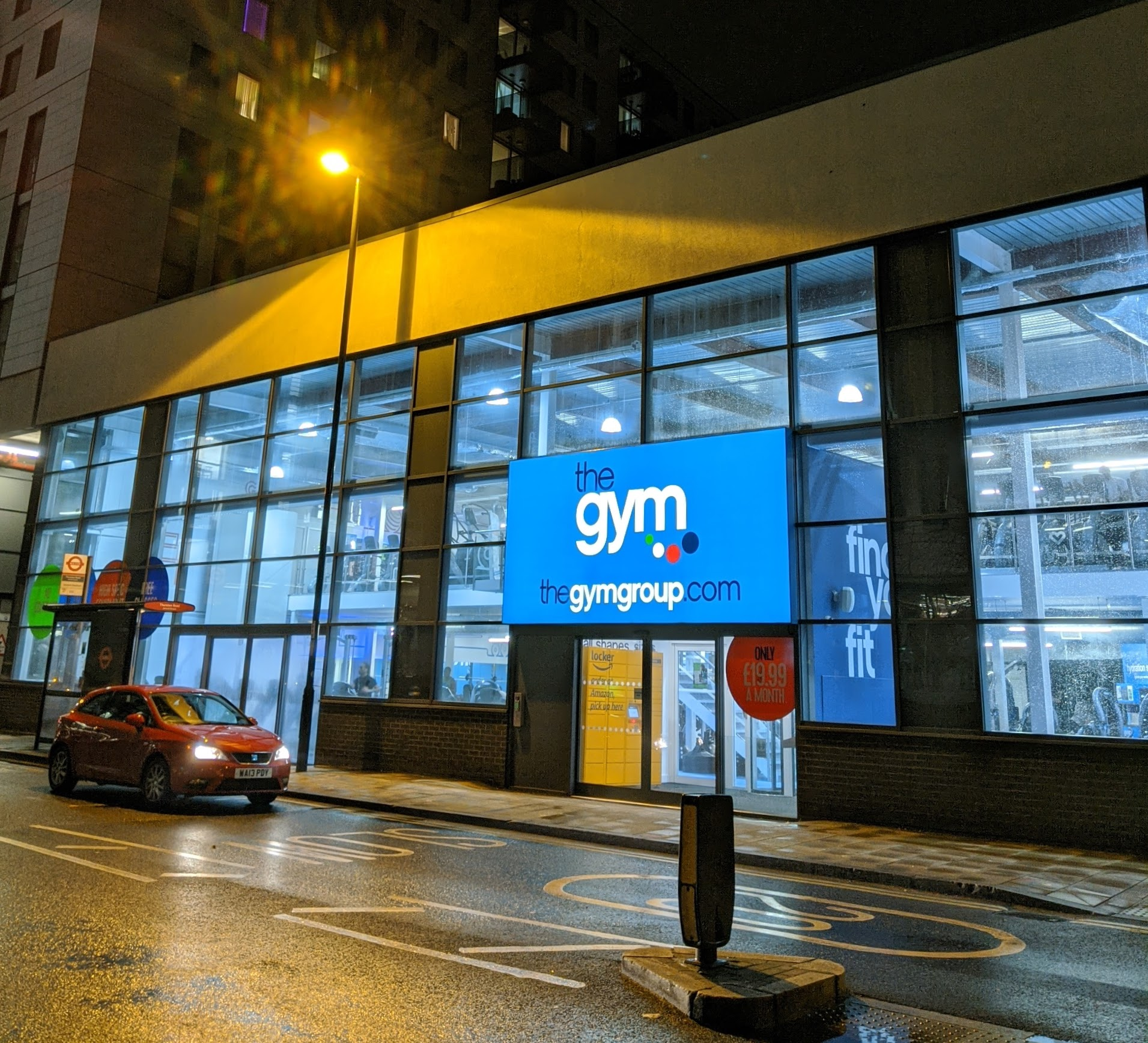
The Gym location in Lewisham, London

The company was founded by a squash player, John Treharne, in Hounslow in West London in 2007. Phoenix Equity Partners and Bridges Ventures invested in the company in its early years.

The business was listed on the Sunday Times Fast Track 100 in 2012. The Gym Group and PureGym explored a merger in 2014, but this was later abandoned. The Gym Group floated on the London Stock Exchange in 2015.

== Operations ==
The company had 229 gyms and 812,000 members as of 31 December 2022.
