= Globe Investment Trust =

British investment trust

- Company type: Public
- Industry: Investment Trust
- Founded: 1873
- Defunct: 1990
- Fate: Acquired
- Successor: British Coal Pension Fund
- Headquarters: London, UK
- Key people: Sir David Hardy, (Chairman); Jimmy West, (Managing Director)

The Globe Investment Trust plc was a very large British investment trust. It was listed on the London Stock Exchange and was a constituent of the FTSE 100 Index. The trust's portfolio included a mix of large, medium, and small-cap stocks across a range of sectors and regions. It was suitable for investors who are looking for international diversification and a long-term investment horizon.

== History ==
The Company was founded in 1873 as an investment trust dedicated to international equities. It was managed by Charterhouse Group.

In July 1990 the British Coal Pension Fund launched a hostile and ultimately successful takeover bid paying £1.1bn for what was at the time the United Kingdom's largest investment trust.
