= Howdens Joinery =

Kitchen retailer within the United Kingdom

Howden Joinery Group Plc
- Formerly: Maxirace Limited (May–December 1987); MFI Furniture Group Plc (1987–2006); Galiform Plc (2006–2010)
- Company type: Public
- Traded as: LSE: HWDN; FTSE 100 component
- Industry: Furniture
- Founded: 1995
- Founder: Matthew Ingle
- Headquarters: London, England, UK
- Key people: Peter Ventress, (Chairman); Andrew Livingston, (CEO)
- Products: Kitchens; Joinery; Hardware; Flooring; Appliances; Bathroom furniture
- Revenue: ▲£2,418.0 million (2025)
- Operating income: ▲£355.3 million (2025)
- Net income: ▲£267.7 million (2025)
- Website: howdenjoinerygroupplc.com

Howden Joinery Group Plc is the multinational parent company for the Howdens Joinery business (Howdens) based in London, England. It is a supplier of kitchens and joinery products to the building trade. It is listed on the London Stock Exchange, and is a constituent of the FTSE 100 Index.

== History ==
The brand was adopted and developed by Matthew Ingle as a business unit within MFI Furniture Group plc (MFI) in 1995. It started trading with 14 depots. In October 2006, MFI sold its loss-making MFI retail business to Merchant Equity Partners for £1, whilst retaining Howdens. At the same time, the name of MFI was changed to Galiform plc.

In 2007, Howdens' own appliance brand, Lamona, was launched.

In November 2008, the MFI retail business entered administration, and Galiform became liable for the costs associated with 46 MFI stores (the legacy properties), incurring an exceptional charge of £99.7m. However, by December 2012 the legacy properties had been reduced by over 80%.

In September 2010, Galiform changed its name to Howden Joinery Group plc. Howdens was granted a Royal Warrant as a Supplier of Fitted Kitchens by Appointment to Queen Elizabeth II in January 2015, and was chosen as one of The Sunday Times 25 Best Big Companies to Work For in 2020.

In July 2017, the company announced the retirement of Matthew Ingle, after twenty two years at the company, and the appointment Andrew Livingston who joined as chief executive in January 2018. In September 2019, Howdens refreshed the creative execution of the brand – with a new logo and the removal of "Joinery" from the brand mark.

The brand was listed as a Business Superbrand in September 2019.

In February 2022, the company acquired the solid surface worktop business Sheridan Fabrications as part of its strategy to expand its kitchen offering into the higher-priced sector.

In 2023 Howdens opened a permanent expo centre at its Howden site, followed by one at its Raunds site in April 2024, and one at its Howden site in August 2025.

== Operations ==
The company has more than 900 depots in the UK and Ireland. It also trades as Howdens Cuisines from over 60 depots in France and Belgium.

Howdens sells kitchens (including worktops, flooring, appliances, sinks, taps and lighting), bedrooms, joinery, hardware, tools, and bathroom cabinetry. It offers a free home survey and planning service.

The company manufactures its cabinets, selected frontals and panels, laminate worktops, skirting and architrave at its factories in Howden, East Yorkshire and Runcorn, Cheshire. It has its own paint to order facility in Thorne, South Yorkshire.
