= Polar Capital Technology Trust =

Large British investment trust

- Company type: Public
- Traded as: LSE: PCT; FTSE 100 Component
- Industry: Investment
- Headquarters: London, UK
- Key people: Catherine Cripps (Chairperson)
- Website: www.polarcapitaltechnologytrust.co.uk

Polar Capital Technology Trust is a large British investment trust dedicated to investing in a portfolio of technology companies. It is managed by Polar Capital and the chair is Catherine Cripps. The company is listed on the London Stock Exchange and is a constituent of the FTSE 100 Index.

== History ==
The trust was launched by Henderson Global Investors under the name Henderson Technology Trust in December 1996. The current name was adopted, after management of the trust was transferred to Polar Capital LLP in April 2001. In December 2024, the management team indicated a focus on the long-term potential of artificial intelligence.

== See also ==
- Polar Capital Global Financials Trust
