= Smart Metering Systems =

British energy infrastructure company

- Smart Metering Systems logo
- Type: Privately held company
- Industry: Utilities; Clean technology; Energy storage
- Founded: 1995; 31 years ago in Glasgow, Scotland
- Headquarters: Glasgow, Scotland
- Area served: United Kingdom
- Key people: Tim Mortlock (chief executive officer)
- Services: Smart metering; Energy data; Battery energy storage; EV chargepoint solutions; Utility infrastructure; Renewable energy
- Revenue: ▲£108.48m (2021)
- Parent: KKR
- Subsidiaries: CH4 Gas Utility and Maintenance Services Limited; Qton Solutions Limited; Solo Energy Limited; Trojan Utilities Limited; UK Meter Assets Limited; Utility Partnership Limited
- Website: www.smsenergy.com

Smart Metering Systems (SMS) is a British energy infrastructure company founded in Glasgow, Scotland in 1995. As of 2022, SMS has around 1,200 employees.

== History ==
SMS was founded by Stephen Timoney in 1995 and is part of the FTSE AIM UK 50 Index. Effective 1 March 2022, Tim Mortlock, former chief operating officer of SMS, is chief executive officer.

In December 2023, KKR launched a successful takeover offer.

== Smart meter rollout ==
In 2014, SMS obtained a contract with British Gas to manage its commercial utility metering, as well as a three-year contract to install and maintain 50% of British Gas Business’s portfolio of gas meter points. This followed the smart metering implementation programme published by the Department of Energy and Climate Change in 2012 and updated in 2013, setting out the UK Government’s target of having 53 million gas and electricity meters installed at 30 million domestic properties by 2020. The UK’s smart meter rollout programme received criticism in 2018 due to installation delays, after only 12.8 million out of the proposed 53 million smart meters had been installed to date. Criticism included a report from the British Infrastructure Group, which raised concerns over the continued use and installation of obsolete SMETS1 meters.

In 2019, the Government delayed the 2020 smart meter rollout deadline to 2024. The Department for Business, Energy & Industrial Strategy further delayed the deadline to 2025 in November 2020, due to the impact of the COVID-19 pandemic.

SMS sold a stake in its customer assets portfolio for £291 million in 2020.

== Acquisitions ==
In April 2014, SMS acquired Utility Partnership Ltd (UPL) for £14 million, followed by CH4 Gas Utility, Trojan Utilities and Qton in 2016 for £455,000 and Irish tech startup Solo Energy in 2020.

== See also ==
- Green electricity in the United Kingdom
- Energy policy of the United Kingdom
- Energy use and conservation in the United Kingdom
- Big Six energy suppliers
- Smart meters
