= FTSE Fledgling Index =

British stock market index

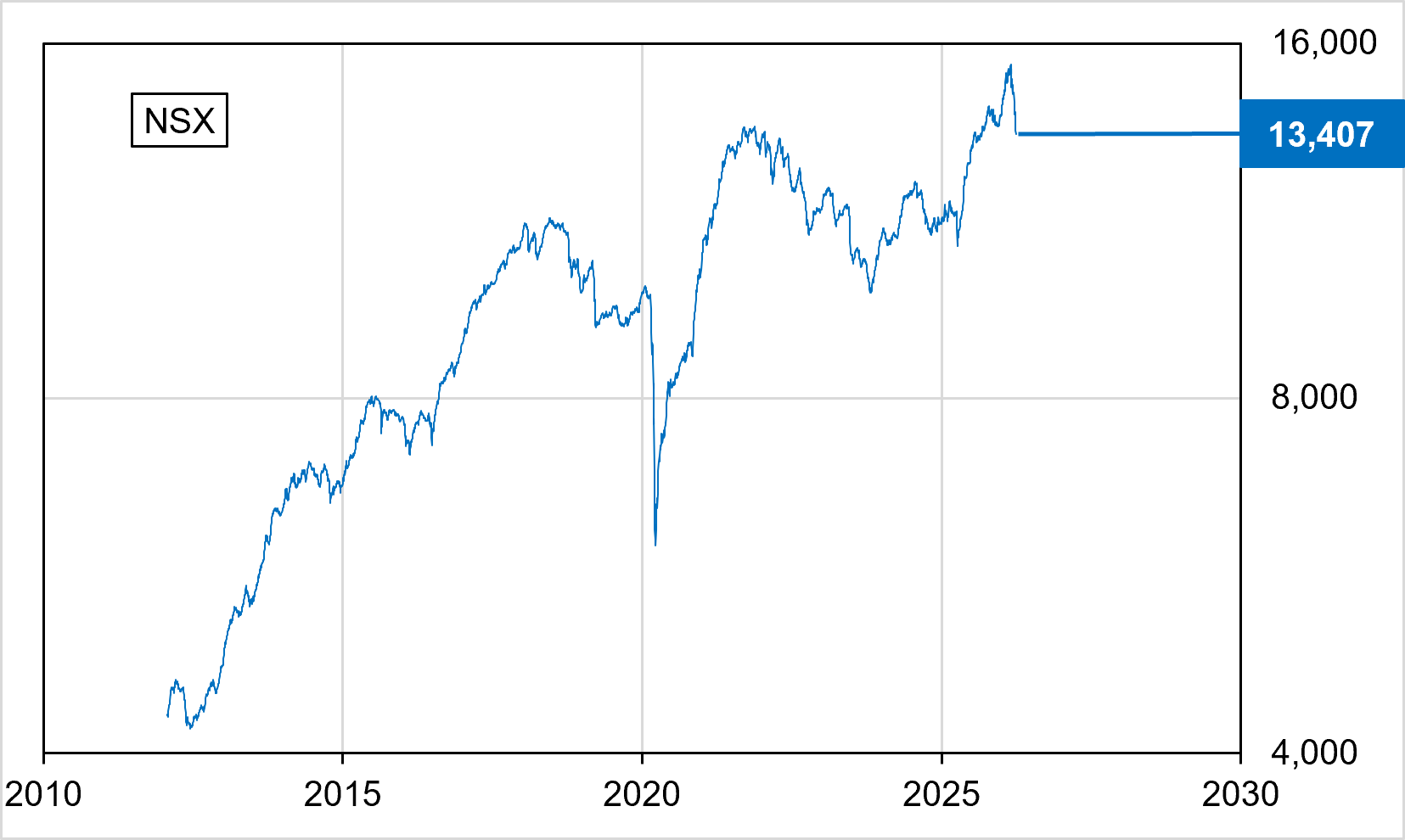
- FTSE Fledgling Index from 2012 to 2026
- Operator: FTSE Russell
- Exchanges: London Stock Exchange
- Trading symbol: NSX
- Constituents: 37 (March 2026)
- Type: Micro-cap
- Market cap: £780 million (March 2026)
- Weighting method: Capitalisation-weighted
- Related indices: FTSE 100 Index; FTSE 250 Index; FTSE 350 Index; FTSE SmallCap Index; FTSE All-Share Index; FTSE AIM UK 50 Index
- Website: www.lseg.com/en/ftse-russell/indices/uk
- Reuters: .FTFL
- Bloomberg: NSX:IND

The FTSE Fledgling Index comprises companies listed on the main market of the London Stock Exchange (LSE) which qualify as eligible for inclusion in the FTSE UK series but are too small to be included in the FTSE All-Share Index. There is no liquidity requirement for constituents of the FTSE Fledgling Index.

This Index is calculated on an end-of-day basis.

== ICB Supersector Breakdown ==
The ICB Supersector breakdown as of March 2026 was as follows:

ICB Supersector	No. of Cons	Net MCap (GBPm)	Wgt %
Technology	1	7	0.83
Telecommunications	-	-	-
Health Care	-	-	-
Financials	22	499	63.99
Real Estate	4	103	13.25
Consumer Discretionary	4	20	2.57
Consumer Staples	1	28	3.57
Industrials	2	38	4.84
Basic Materials	2	35	4.5
Energy	-	-	-
Utilities	1	50	6.44
Totals	37	780	100.00

== See also ==
- FTSE 100
- FTSE 250
- FTSE 350
- FTSE SmallCap Index
- FTSE All-Share Index
