= Diversified Energy =

Largest U.S. owner of oil and gas wells

Diversified Energy Company PLC
- Type: Public
- Traded as: LSE: DEC
- Industry: Oil and gas
- Founded: 2001; 25 years ago
- Headquarters: Birmingham, Alabama
- Key people: David Johnson (Chairman); Robert Hutson (CEO)
- Revenue: ▼$794.8 million (2024)
- Operating income: ▼$(43.0) million (2024)
- Net income: ▼$(88.8) million (2024)
- Website: www.div.energy

Diversified Energy Company PLC, formerly Diversified Gas & Oil PLC, is a gas and oil production company operating in the Appalachian Basin and the Central Region in the United States. It is listed on the London Stock Exchange and the New York Stock Exchange.

== History ==
The company was established by Robert ('Rusty') Hutson when he bought a gas well in West Virginia in 2001. The management then grew the business over the next decade by acquiring old gas and oil wells that the main producers did not want. It was the subject of a flotation on the Alternative Investment Market in February 2017 and moved to the premium market in May 2020.

On 6 May 2021 the changed its name from Diversified Gas & Oil PLC to Diversified Energy Company PLC and changed its TIDM code from DGOC to DEC.

In December 2021 Diversified Energy acquired the Oklahoma-based Tapstone Energy Holdings, LLC for $174 million.

In April 2022, it was announced that Diversified Energy had acquired "certain East Texas upstream assets and related facilities" from a private seller for $50 million USD in cash.

In September 2022 Diversified Energy acquired certain upstream assets and related facilities from ConocoPhillips Company for $240 million.

In March 2023 Diversified Energy completed an acquisition of certain upstream assets and related facilities in Texas from Tanos Energy Holdings II LLC for $250 million.

Diversified Energy acquired Canvas Energy, an Alabama based company for $550 million in September 2025.

In October 2025, the company announced that it would move its main listing to the New York Stock Exchange.

The company announced in September 2026 it would acquire Birch Energy for $1.8 billion.

== Operations ==
Diversified Energy primarily purchases end-of-life wells from major producers. These wells are inexpensive because state law requires non-producing wells be plugged, and the wells are priced with the expectation that they will have to be plugged in the near future. This is an expensive procedure, though. Diversified Energy reports that it can do so for under $25,000 per well, less than other producers. The company was able to demonstrate that it can consistently retire wells at a lower cost point. In 2022 Diversified Energy retired 200 wells. In the first six months of 2023 it retired an additional 100 wells. Diversified Energy expects to be able to operate these wells for as many as 50 more years, which greatly reduces the present value of the future plugging liability. Because of this reduction in liability, Diversified Energy is able to record the wells at a higher value than it paid. Since 2014, Diversified Energy has made more from these accounting gains than its cumulative reported profit.

The company owns over 69,000 oil and gas wells as of October 2021, making it the largest well owner in the United States.

Diversified Energy's business model consists of buying up aging wells with a low-decline profile. It then hedges the expected production for several years out and thus creates predictable cash-flows. This hedged production is placed into asset-backed securities (ABS) to access investment-grade debt financing. The ABS have an amortizing structure to align with the declining production profile. In 2022 Diversified Energy acquired three well-plugging companies that were combined in its subsidiary, Next LVL Energy.

Diversified Energy entered into well plugging agreements with the states of Kentucky, West Virginia, Ohio and Pennsylvania in 2019 and 2020. These agreements extend between 10 and 15 years and commit the company to plug a set number of wells per year.

== Environmental Impact ==
In 2018, the Pennsylvania Department of Environmental Protection found a subsidiary of Diversified Energy to be out of compliance on over 1,000 abandoned wells.

In 2019 in Ohio, Diversified Energy was found to have falsely claimed a well was producing natural gas, which meant the well was not required to be plugged. Diversified Energy claimed it was an unintentional mistake.

In April 2021, Diversified Energy claimed in a report to investors that it had reduced greenhouse gas emissions 28% from 2019 to 2020, but reported to the Environmental Protection Agency that it had actually increased emissions 19% during the same time period.

An October 2021 investigation by Bloomberg News found that 59% of sampled natural gas wells belonging to Diversified Energy were leaking significant amounts of methane, a potent greenhouse gas. These wells were producing little to no natural gas, and some of them appeared to be abandoned. State laws require that non producing gas wells be plugged promptly, a costly procedure. The company's share price dropped 21% in one day following publication of the investigation.
