= Tracsis =

British transport technology company

Tracsis plc
- Type: Public
- Traded as: LSE: TRCS
- Industry: IT Services
- Founded: 2004; 22 years ago, in Leeds, England
- Headquarters: Leeds, UK
- Key people: David Frost (CEO); Andrew Kelly (CFO); Jill Easterbrook (Chair)
- Number of employees: 910 (2026)
- Website: www.tracsis.com

Tracsis is a United Kingdom-based company that provides software technologies for the rail, traffic data and wider transport industries. The company is headquartered in Leeds and is a constituent of the Alternative Investment Market (AIM) market on the London Stock Exchange.

== History ==
The company was created as a spin-out of the Computing Department of the University of Leeds, and rapidly grew through expansion. The company's first acquisition, Robert Watson Associates, was larger than Tracsis at the time and was spun-out of Loughborough University.

In 2005, John McArthur became CEO of the company.

The company has been on the AIM market since November 2007.

In 2014, Tracsis won the Growth Business of the Year Award from the UK Tech Awards.

In 2016, McArthur sold a tenth of his holding in the company.

In 2019, McArthur was succeeded by Chris Barnes, who was previously head of automotive consulting at Ricardo plc.

On 1st August 2025 Chris Barnes was succeeded by David Frost, who was previously Chief Executive Officer at Ovarro Ltd

=== Acquisitions ===
| Company acquired | Business purpose | Year acquired |
|---|---|---|
| RWA Rail Limited | Consultancy services to the rail sector focusing on operational and strategic planning | 2008 |
| Peeping Limited | Demand and queueing software and research based services to train operating companies including station footfall assessment and rail related surveys | 2009 |
| Safety Information Systems Limited | Data analysis, process control and management reporting software | 2009 |
| MPEC Technology Limited | Remote Event and Condition Monitoring hardware and software | 2011 |
| Sky High Plc | Vehicle traffic and event monitoring | 2013 |
| Datasys Integration Limited | Software for capturing, reporting and analysing the root causes of delays and other performance critical information | 2014 |
| SEP Limited and SEP Events Limited | Traffic planning and management services for the events industry | 2015 |
| Ontrac Limited and Ontrac Technology Limited | Rail safety software | 2015 |
| Travel Compensation Services Ltd, Delay Repay Sniper Ltd and S Dalby Consulting Ltd | Delay repay solutions | 2018 |
| Compass Informatics Limited (Ireland) and Compass Informatics UK Limited | Irish data analytics | 2019 |
| Cash & Traffic Management Limited | Event traffic planning and admission control | 2019 |
| Bellvedi Limited | Timetable planning and optimisation software | 2019 |
| iBlocks Limited | Smart ticketing solutions and delay repay | 2020 |
| Icon Group Limited | Geoscience and spatial data analysis | 2021 |
| Flash Forward Consulting | Strategic, commercial, operations and stakeholder management | 2021 |
| RailComm | US-based provider of rail automation software | 2022 |
| Mistral Data Limited | UK-based provider of rail software solutions | 2026 |

== Operations ==
Originally focused on software to help railway operators manage their operations, such as vehicle and crew scheduling, resource management, and monitoring, it has expanded to cover ticketing, data analytics, and event management for the wider transport industry, with notable systems such as PCDS, which helped the UK rail industry recover from COVID-19 by providing train operators with robust means to quickly and accurately assess the numbers of passengers using services across the rail network.

Clients include Network Rail and bus and train operating companies such as Go-Ahead Group and FirstGroup.
