= FTSE 350 Index =

British stock market index

FTSE 350

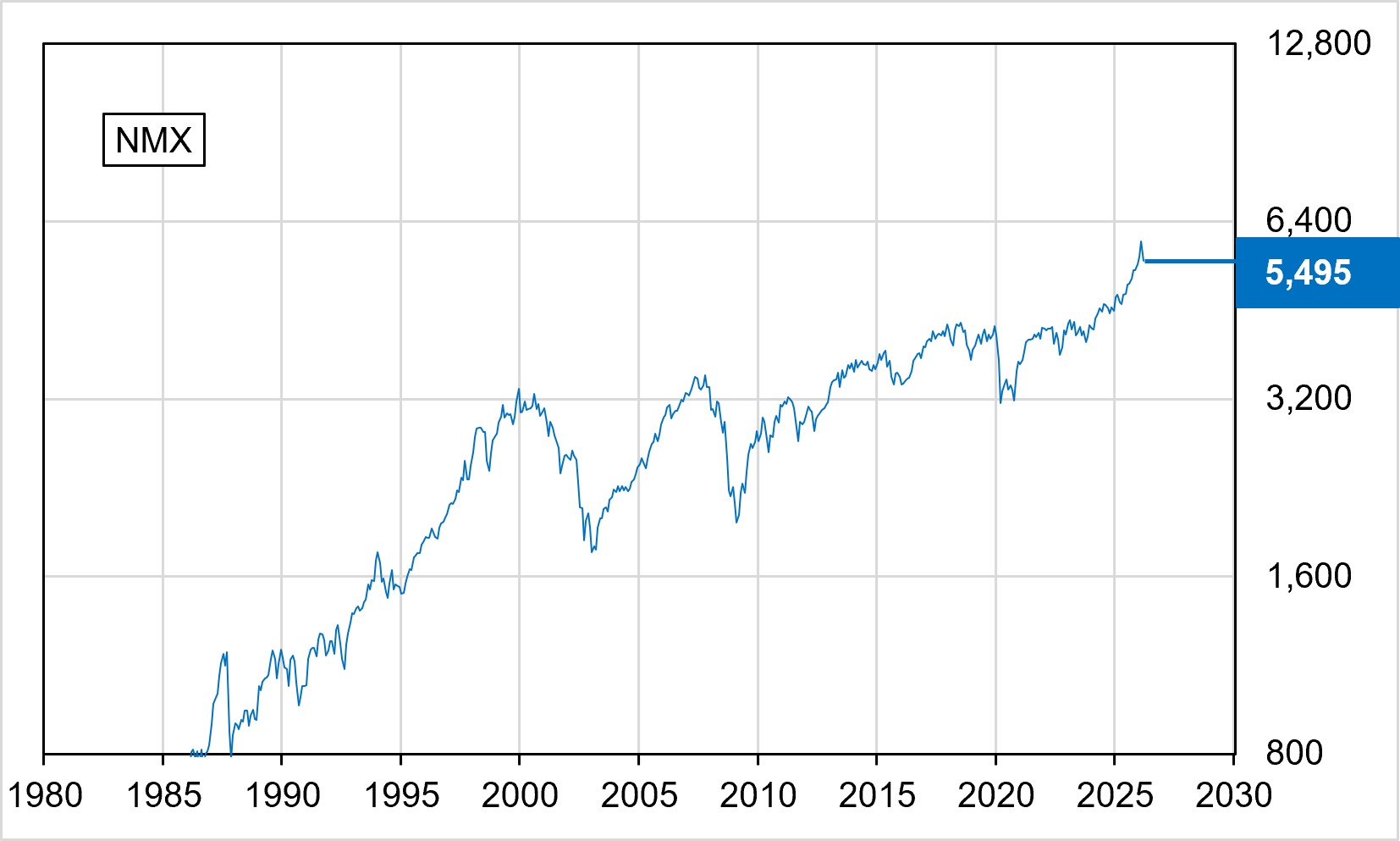
- Performance of the FTSE 350 index between December 1983 and March 2026
- Foundation: 30 December 1983
- Operator: FTSE Russell
- Exchanges: London Stock Exchange
- Trading symbol: NMX
- Constituents: 350 (March 2026)
- Type: Large and Mid-cap
- Market cap: £2.710 trillion (March 2026)
- Weighting method: Capitalisation-weighted
- Related indices: FTSE 100 Index; FTSE 250 Index; FTSE SmallCap Index; FTSE All-Share Index; FTSE Fledgling Index; FTSE AIM UK 50 Index
- Website: www.lseg.com/en/ftse-russell/indices/uk
- Reuters: .FTLC
- Bloomberg: NMX:IND

The Financial Times Stock Exchange 350 Index, also called the FTSE 350 Index, FTSE 350, is a market capitalization weighted stock market index made up of the constituents of the FTSE 100 and FTSE 250 indices. The FTSE 100 Index comprises the largest 100 companies by capitalization which have their primary listing on the London Stock Exchange, while the FTSE 250 Index comprises mid-capitalized companies not covered by the FTSE 100, i.e. the 101st to 350th largest. See the articles about those indices for lists of the constituents of the FTSE 350.

The index is maintained by FTSE Russell, a subsidiary of the London Stock Exchange Group.
