= Oclaro =

- Company type: Public
- Traded as: Nasdaq: OCLR; S&P 600 component
- Industry: Optical components
- Founded: 1988
- Headquarters: San Jose, California
- Key people: Greg Dougherty (CEO)
- Revenue: $566 million (2013)
- Operating income: $(124.8) million (2013)
- Net income: $(122.7) million (2013)
- Website: Oclaro.com

Oclaro was a US-based business manufacturing and selling optical components. Oclaro was formerly listed on the London Stock Exchange and was a constituent of the FTSE 100 Index. The company is now part of Lumentum (LITE) after it was acquired in December 2018.

== History ==
The company was founded in the United Kingdom as Bookham Technology in 1988. It became the first company to make optical components that can be integrated into a silicon integrated circuit. In 2002 the Company expanded substantially when it acquired the optical components businesses of Marconi and Nortel Networks. In 2003 it acquired Cierra Photonics of Santa Rosa, California, and New Focus, a US business, for £118 million. In 2004 it acquired Onetta, Inc. and became a US-domiciled company. In March 2006, Bookham acquired Avalon Photonics, based in Zurich, Switzerland.

In late April 2009 the Bookham and Avanex Corporations (Note: Avanex Corporation was incorporated in 1997 and had their initial public offering on February 4, 2000, raising US$216 million, and was based in Fremont, California. By 2002 (after the dot-com bubble had burst) restructuring included shutting down a plant in Richardson, Texas. In 2003 Avanex acquired Alcatel Optronics France SA from Alcatel and the photonic technology business of Corning Incorporated.) announced that they had merged, creating what they hoped would be one of the largest suppliers of optical components, modules and subsystems for telecommunications. The newly combined company was named Oclaro combining the words Optical and Clarity.

On March 26, 2012, Oclaro, Inc. announced the acquisition of Opnext, which was founded as a venture of the Clarity Group and optical researchers from Hitachi. The merger between Oclaro and Opnext was approved by shareholders of both companies on July 23, 2012.

Oclaro was acquired by Lumentum in December 2018 for approximately $1.8 billion.
