= List of largest companies in the United Kingdom =

This article lists the largest companies in the United Kingdom in terms of their revenue, net profit, and total assets, according to the American business magazines Fortune, Forbes, and the United Kingdom-based B2B data provider Global Database.

== 2024 Fortune 500 ==
The following are the 17 British companies in the Fortune Global 500, which ranks the world's largest companies by annual revenue. The figures below are given in millions of US dollars and are for the fiscal year 2023/24. Also listed are the headquarters location, net profit, number of employees worldwide and industry sector of each company.

Rank	Fortune 500 rank	Name	Industry	Revenue (USD millions)	Profits (USD millions)	Assets (USD millions)	Employees	Headquarters
1	▼13	Shell plc	Oil and Gas	▲323,183	▲19,359	406,270	103,000	London
2	▼25	BP	Oil and Gas	▼213,032	▲15,239	280,294	79,400	London
▲3	▲67	HSBC	Banking	▼134,901	▲23,533	3,038,677	220,861	London
▼4	▼140	Tesco	Retail	▲86,231	▲1,487	59,498	225,659	Welwyn Garden City
▲5	▲204	Lloyds Banking Group	Banking	▲66,670	▼6,786	1,454,900	62,569	London
▲6	▼210	Unilever	Consumer goods	▲64,436	▼7,013	83,130	74,000	London
▲7	▲212	Barclays	Banking	▲63,801	▼6,536	1,883,109	124,995	London
▼8	▼264	Rio Tinto	Mining	▼54,041	▼10,058	103,549	57,174	London
▲9	▼310	Vodafone	Telecommunication	▲48,871	▼1,236	155,751	96,282	Newbury
▲10	▲329	AstraZeneca	Pharmaceuticals	▲45,811	▲5,955	101,119	83,100	Cambridge
▲11	▼396	Sainsbury's	Retail	▲41,088	▼172	31,667	100,000	London
▲12	▲396	Standard Chartered	Banking	▲38,292	▲3,469	822,844	84,958	London
▲13	▲398	Compass Group	Retail	▲38,005	▲1,610	21,490	562,460	Chertsey
▼14	▼400	GlaxoSmithKline	Pharmaceuticals	▼37,692	▼6,125	75,204	70,212	London
▲15	▼464	British American Tobacco	Consumer goods	▼33,907	▼ -17,855	151,308	49,839	London
▲16	▲485	Centrica	Oil and Gas	▲32,882	▲4,883	27,232	21,014	Windsor
▲17	▲486	Linde	Chemicals	▼32,854	▲6,199	80,811	66,323	Guildford

== 2024 Global Database list ==
This list is based on the Global Database, which ranks the largest publicly traded companies in the United Kingdom. The ranking considers reported 2024 financial results, including revenue, operating income, net income, total assets, and total equity for each company. The table below also lists the headquarters location and industry sector of each company. The figures represent the latest available data for the financial year 2023/24. The 50 highest ranked companies from the United Kingdom are listed.

Rank	Name	Headquarters	Revenue	Net income	Total assets	Total equity	Industry
1	Shell plc	London	284.30 billion USD (▼)	16.50 billion USD (▼)	387.60 billion USD (▼)	180.20 billion USD (▼)	Oil and Gas
2	BP	London	189.18 billion USD (▼)	1.23 billion USD (▼)	282.23 billion USD (▲)	78.32 billion USD (▼)	Oil and Gas
3	HSBC	London	62.44 billion USD (▼)	24.99 billion USD (▲)	3.02 trillion USD (▼)	192.27 billion USD (▼)	Banking
4	Unilever	London	60.76 billion EUR (▲)	6.37 billion EUR (▼)	79.75 billion EUR (▲)	22.56 billion EUR (▲)	Consumer goods
5	Vodafone	Newbury	37.45 billion EUR (▲)	−3.75 billion EUR (▼)	128.52 billion EUR (▼)	53.92 billion EUR (▼)	Telecommunications
6	Tesco	Welwyn Garden City	67.67 billion GBP (▲)	1.19 billion GBP (▲)	16.61 billion GBP (▲)	11.67 billion GBP (▼)	Retail
7	Prudential plc	London	10.36 billion USD (▲)	2.42 billion USD (▲)	181.88 billion USD (▲)	18.67 billion USD (▲)	Financial services

== 2024 Forbes list ==
This list is based on the Forbes Global 2000, which ranks the world's 2,000 largest publicly traded companies. The Forbes list takes into account a multitude of factors, including the revenue, net profit, total assets and market value of each company; each factor is given a weighted rank in terms of importance when considering the overall ranking. The table below also lists the headquarters location and industry sector of each company. The figures are in billions of US dollars and are for the financial year 2023/24. The 50 highest ranked companies from the United Kingdom are listed.

Rank	Forbes 2000 rank	Name	Headquarters	Revenue (billions US$)	Profit (billions US$)	Industry
▲1	▲15	HSBC	London	▲144.9	▲22.2	Banking
▼2	▲17	Shell plc	London	▲261.76	▼17.9	Oil and Gas
▲3	▲47	BP	London	▲202.8	▲9.2	Oil and Gas
4	▼110	Rio Tinto	London	▼54.0	▼10.1	Mining
▲5	▲121	AstraZeneca	Cambridge	▲47.6	▲6.3	Pharmaceuticals
▲6	▲122	Unilever	London	▲64.5	▼7.0	Consumer goods
▼7	▼154	Lloyds Banking Group	London	▼33.1	▼5.8	Banking
▲8	▼166	Barclays	London	▲31.5	▼5.1	Banking
▲9	▲167	Linde	Guildford	▲32.8	▲6.3	Chemicals
▲10	▲177	NatWest Group	Edinburgh	▲33.7	▲5.1	Banking
▼11	▼183	GlaxoSmithKline	London	▼38.6	▼5.6	Pharmaceuticals
▲12	▲204	National Grid	London	▲25.4	▲9.4	Utilities
▲13	▲227	Standard Chartered	London	▲40.1	▲3.3	Finance
▲14	▼314	Diageo	London	▲20.4	▼4.0	Beverages
▲15	▲349	Vodafone	Newbury	▼39.8	▲1.2	Telecommunication
▲16	▼359	Tesco	Welwyn Garden City	▲85.3	▼1.5	Retail
▲17	▲361	BAE Systems	London, Farnborough	▲28.7	▼2.3	Aerospace and defence
▲18	▲374	Aviva	London	▼43.2	▲1.3	Insurance
▲19	▲391	Rolls-Royce	London	▲20.5	▲3.0	Aerospace and defence
▼20	▼401	LyondellBasell Industries	London	▼40.6	▼2.1	Chemicals
▲21	▲451	London Stock Exchange	London	▲10.4	▲0.95	Finance
▼22	▼471	BT Group	London	▼25.4	▲2.3	Telecommunication
▲23	▲478	Compass Group	Chertsey	▲40.1	▲1.7	Services
▲24	▲481	Prudential	London	▼10.9	▲1.7	Insurance
▲25	▲491	Reckitt Benckiser	Slough	▲18.2	▲2.0	Consumer goods
▼26	▼501	Imperial Brands	Bristol	▲22.8	▲2.6	Consumer goods
▼27	▼508	Legal & General	London	▼55.9	▼0.54	Insurance
▲28	▲514	Coca-Cola Europacific Partners	London	▲19.8	▲1.8	Beverages
▼29	▼528	British American Tobacco	London	▼33.9	▼-17.9	Consumer goods
▼30	▼546	CNH Industrial	London	▼24.2	▲2.3	Industrials
▲31	▲568	Haleon	Weybridge	▲14.0	▲1.3	Healthcare
▲32	▲579	International Airlines Group	London	▲31.8	▲2.9	Aviation
▲33	▲604	Associated British Foods	London	▲24.9	▲1.5	Retail
▼35	▲646	RELX	London	▲11.4	▲2.2	Services
▲36	▲651	Centrica	Windsor	▲32.9	▲4.9	Utilities
▼37	▲654	Anglo American	London	▼30.7	▲0.31	Mining
▲38	▲748	Ashtead Group	London	▲10.7	▲1.6	Services
▲39	▲757	3i Group	London	▲0.71	▲4.8	Finance
▼40	▼779	SSE	Perth	▲14.3	▼0.71	Energy
▼41	▼797	Willis Towers Watson	London	▲9.6	▼1.0	Insurance
▼42	▼885	Phoenix Group	London	▼33.2	▲-0.17	Insurance
▼43	▼967	St James's Place	Cirencester	▼23.6	▼-0.13	Insurance
▼44	▼1087	M&G	London	▼13.8	▲0.37	Insurance
▼45	▼1089	WPP	London	▲18.5	▲0.14	Advertising
▼46	▼1093	Antofagasta plc	London	▼6.3	▼0.83	Mining
47	▲1103	Sainsbury's	London	▲40.9	▼0.17	Retail
▼48	▼1126	Amcor	Warmley	▲13.8	▼0.65	Packaging materials
▲49	▲1167	Investec	London	▲6.2	▲1.1	Banking
▲50	▲1229	Bunzl	London	▲14.7	▲0.65	Distributions

== See also ==
- List of companies of the United Kingdom
- List of largest private companies in the United Kingdom
- List of largest companies by revenue
- List of largest private non-governmental companies by revenue
