= Riverstone Holdings =

American multinational private equity firm

- Type: Private
- Industry: Private equity, Energy & Power
- Founded: 2000; 26 years ago
- Founder: Pierre F. Lapeyre, Jr. David M. Leuschen
- Headquarters: 712 5th Avenue; New York, New York, United States
- Products: Leveraged buyout, Growth capital, Credit
- Number of employees: 100+
- Website: www.riverstonellc.com

Riverstone Holdings is a multinational private equity firm based in New York City focused on leveraged buyout, growth capital, and credit investments in the energy industry and electrical power industry sectors. The firm focuses on oil and gas exploration, midstream pipelines, electricity generation, energy and power services, energy and power technology, and renewable energy infrastructure and technology. Riverstone has raised approximately $41 billion since the firm's inception in 2000.

== History ==
Riverstone was founded by Pierre F. Lapeyre, Jr. and David M. Leuschen, who had been instrumental in the formation of the Goldman Sachs Global Energy & Power Group in the mid 1980s.

The firm is based in New York and has offices in Houston, London, and Mexico City. Riverstone and Carlyle closed on their first fund with $222 million of commitments in 2001. In June 2004, the firms completed fundraising for Carlyle/Riverstone Global Energy & Power Fund II, with $1.1 billion of investor commitments, almost five times the size of the first fund. In 2006, Riverstone and Carlyle raised a pair of funds, including the third in its series of main funds, Carlyle/Riverstone Global Energy and Power III, which raised $3.8 billion of capital. The two firms also raised their first renewable energy focused fund, Carlyle/Riverstone Renewable Energy Infrastructure Fund I, with $685 Million.

Also in 2006, Riverstone was a member of a consortium of private equity firms including Goldman Sachs Alternatives and Carlyle Group that completed the $27.5 billion (including assumed debt) acquisition of Kinder Morgan, one of the largest pipeline operators in the US. The buyout was backed by Richard Kinder, a former president of Enron.

In 2008, Riverstone and Carlyle raised $6 billion for their fourth main energy fund, Riverstone/Carlyle Global Power & Energy Fund IV. Additionally in 2008, the firms raised a $3.4 billion Riverstone/Carlyle Renewable Energy Infrastructure Fund II as a successor to the $685 million fund raised in 2006 to focus on renewable energy investments.

In 2009 the New York Attorney General Andrew Cuomo ordered Riverstone Holdings LLC to pay $30 million in restitution after Riverstone Holdings employed fixers to get them business from pension funds controlled by "corrupt" state officials.

Then in 2013, Riverstone (operating without Carlyle) raised $7.7 billion for its fifth main energy fund, Riverstone Global Power & Energy Fund V.

In 2016, Riverstone raised $5.1 billion for its sixth main energy fund, Riverstone Global Power & Energy Fund VI.

Also in 2016, Riverstone raised its first flagship credit fund. In 2018 Riverstone raised $750 million for its second credit fund.

In October 2020 Riverstone's Decarbonization Plus Acquisition Corporation (Nasdaq: DCRB) priced a $200 million IPO. In February 2021, Riverstone's Decarbonization Plus Acquisition Corporation II (Nasdaq: DCRN) priced a $350 million IPO.

== Operations ==
As of 2020, Riverstone and Carlyle have six main funds focused on buyouts in energy, two credit funds, and a renewables investing platform with approximately $41 billion of total raised capital. It also manages Riverstone Energy, a company listed on the London Stock Exchange.

== Green/Environmental initiatives ==
In June 2009, Riverstone/Carlyle acquired renewable energy company Pattern Energy Group LP, representing Riverstone's 10th transaction in the Renewable Energy Sector. Pattern Energy is one of the world’s largest private renewable energy companies, with large operating and development footprints in the United States, Canada, and Japan.

In March 2010, Riverstone/Carlyle made an investment in Enviva Partners LP. Enviva is one of the largest suppliers of wood pellets and other processed woody biomass in the world. These products are used by industrial customers. The AES Corporation and Riverstone Holdings LLC announced on March 25 that they have committed up to 1 billion as a part of a new joint venture to develop a global platform of utility-scale solar photovoltaic projects. Together, these firms have provided $500 million of capital over five years to invest in PV solar projects around the world. This jointly owned entity is known as AES Solar, a developer and operator of utility-scale solar installations that will be connected to power grids that supply businesses. These installations consist of land based solar PV panels that capture sunlight and convert it to electricity in order to feed the power grid. In July 2020, Enviva Holdings, LP successfully completed a recapitalization with more than $1 billion of new equity contributions and incremental equity commitments from affiliates of Riverstone.

In January 2021, Riverstone made a commitment to FreeWire Technologies, in electric vehicle (EV) charging and power. Also in January, Riverstone Energy Limited announced an investment of $25 million in Loanpal, LLC, a sustainable home improvement fintech provider used in over half of U.S. residential solar system sales.

In February 2021, Riverstone published their second annual ESG report detailing their commitment to ESG and responsible investing.
