= Riverstone Energy =

Riverstone Energy Limited (LSE: RSE) is a Guernsey-domiciled, closed-ended company which invests in energy companies and assets worldwide. Established by Riverstone Holdings in 2013, the company's investment manager is Riverstone International Limited, which is majority-owned and controlled by affiliates of Riverstone Holdings. Riverstone Energy Limited is listed on the London Stock Exchange.

== History ==
Riverstone Energy Limited was the subject of a £760m initial public offering in October 2013.

In January 2021, Riverstone Energy Limited made two decarbonisation investments in Loanpal, LLC and FreeWire Technologies, Inc. In February 2021, Riverstone Energy Limited announced additional commitments to Decarbonization Plus Acquisition Corporation (NASDAQ: DCRB), via a private placements, and to Decarbonization Plus Acquisition Corporation II (NASDAQ: DCRNU), via an initial public offering.

== Corporate Governance ==
As of December 2020, Riverstone Energy Limited operates with a fully independent board of directors. REL has also committed to a new modified approach to investing, which includes a focus on energy transition and decarbonisation opportunities.
