= Schroder Income Growth Fund =

British investment trust

Schroder Income Growth Fund plc
- Company type: Public company
- Traded as: LSE: SCF; FTSE 250 component
- Industry: Investment trust
- Founded: 1995; 30 years ago
- Website: Official site

The Schroder Income Growth Fund plc is an investment trust that aims to achieve income growth that exceeds inflation and capital growth as a result of that rising income. It primarily invests in the United Kingdom with up to 20% of the portfolio being invested in equities on a stock exchange based outside of the UK such as on BATS Chi-X Europe. Founded in 1995, the fund is listed on the London Stock Exchange. The fund is managed by Sue Noffke, the Head of UK Equities at Schroders.
