= Liontrust Asset Management =

British fund management company

Liontrust Asset Management plc
- Formerly: 206th Shelf Investment Company Limited (August–October 1994); River & Mercantile Asset Management Limited (1994–1999); Lionheart Asset Management plc (June–July 1999)
- Type: Public limited company
- Traded as: LSE: LIO; FTSE 250 Component
- Industry: Investment management
- Founded: 2 August 1994; 31 years ago
- Headquarters: London, England
- Key people: Luke Savage (Chairman); John Ions (Chief Executive)
- Products: Asset Management services
- Revenue: ▼£134.4 million (2026)
- Operating income: ▼£13.5 million (2026)
- Net income: ▼£9.6 million (2026)
- Website: liontrust.co.uk

Liontrust Asset Management is a British fund management company that specialises in investments for European and South American clients. It manages open-ended funds domiciled in the UK and Ireland, multi-asset portfolios, the Edinburgh investment Trust and segregated accounts. It is listed on the London Stock Exchange.

Liontrust handles investments for clients in Europe and South America. Liontrust is headquartered in London and also has offices in Edinburgh and Luxembourg.

== History ==
Liontrust was established in 1994 and launched in 1995, and had an initial public offering on the London Stock Exchange in 1999 as Liontrust Asset Management PLC. Liontrust became a constituent of the FTSE SmallCap in 2014 and entered the FTSE 250 in 2020.

Adrian Collins became non-executive chair in early 2009. John Ions became chief executive in May 2010. Vinay Abrol became the CFO/COO while Alastair Barbour took over from Adrian Collins as non-executive Chair in 2019.

The Economic Advantage team was formed in 1997, the Cashflow Solution team in 2006 and the Global Fixed Income team in 2018.

== Acquisitions ==
Liontrust acquired North Investment Partners Multi Asset team and portfolios in 2013. In 2017 Liontrust completed their £30 million acquisition of Alliance Trust Investments, creating the Sustainable Investment team.

The £40 million acquisition of Neptune Investment Management completed in 2019, bringing UK, global and emerging markets equity funds to Liontrust.

In 2020, Liontrust bought Architas Advisory Services and Architas Multi-Manager from Axa in a deal worth £75 million, merging the Architas UK Fund Management team with the multi asset investment team at Liontrust and bringing multi-asset funds to Liontrust. After announcing a deal in December 2021.

Liontrust completed the £120 million takeover of Majedie Asset Management in April 2022. Majedie’s fund managers became the Global Fundamental team at Liontrust.
