= Marcus Stuttard =

British chief executive

Marcus Stuttard has been the chief executive of the Alternative Investment Market in London since 2009. He replaced Martin Graham.
