= Fidelity Asian Values =

British investment trust

- Company type: Public company
- Traded as: LSE: FAS
- Industry: Investment
- Founded: 1996; 30 years ago
- Headquarters: London, United Kingdom
- Website: investment-trusts.fidelity.co.uk/fidelity-asian-values/

Fidelity Asian Values (LSE: FAS) is a British investment trust focussed on investment in Asian stock markets (excluding Japan). Established in 1996, the company is listed on the London Stock Exchange. Its chair is Clare Brady and is managed by Nitin Bajaj of Fidelity International.
