= Edinburgh Investment Trust =

Investment trust company

The Edinburgh Investment Trust Public Limited Company
- Traded as: LSE: EDIN; FTSE 250 component
- Industry: Investment trust
- Founded: March 1, 1889; 137 years ago
- Headquarters: Edinburgh, Scotland, UK
- Website: edinburgh-investment-trust.co.uk

The Edinburgh Investment Trust Public Limited Company is an investment trust company dedicated to investing in larger companies. It is listed on the London Stock Exchange and is a constituent of the FTSE 250 Index.

== History ==
The company was established in 1889. Neil Woodford became the fund manager when Invesco Asset Management Limited took over the mandate in September 2008. On learning that Woodford would be leaving Invesco Perpetual in April 2014, the Trust board decided "that Invesco Perpetual should continue as Manager with Mark Barnett taking responsibility for the management of [the] portfolio with effect from 28 January 2014." Majedie Asset Management Limited was appointed in 2020 and Liontrust Asset Management took over in April 2022.
