= Headlam Group =

British-based company

Headlam Group plc
- Type: Public
- Traded as: LSE: HEAD
- Industry: Flooring
- Founded: 1948
- Headquarters: Coleshill, Birmingham, UK
- Key people: Dick Peters, Chairman; Steve Wilson, CEO
- Revenue: ▼£498.7 million (2025)
- Operating income: ▼£(33.4) million (2025)
- Net income: ▼£(81.9) million (2025)
- Website: www.headlamgroup.com

Headlam Group plc is a British-based company which distributes floor coverings throughout Europe. It specializes in carpet, residential vinyl, wood, laminate, luxury vinyl tile, and commercial flooring. Headlam Group was listed on the main market of the London Stock Exchange (LSE: HEAD) until September 2026. In September 2026, it announced the appointment of administrators.

== History ==
The company was established as Headlam, Sims & Coggins in 1948. First listed on the London Stock Exchange in 1988, it initiated a series of acquisitions from Hickson International plc early in 1992. It bought Mercado, a Leeds-based competitor, in 1996. Its international expansion began with the purchase of Lethem-Vergeer in the Netherlands also in 1996. In 2011, Headlam Group purchased a Scottish-based company, West Fife Flooring, for £1.2million.

On 1 September 2026, the board, having exhausted all its available facilities, announced its intention to appoint administrators.

== Operations ==
Headlam Group supplies coverings including parquet, carpets, and linoleum to independent retailers and professional customers in markets which include the Netherlands, France and Switzerland.
