= Fidelity Japan Trust =

British investment trust

- Company type: Public company
- Traded as: LSE: FAS
- Industry: Investment
- Founded: 1994; 32 years ago
- Headquarters: London, United Kingdom
- Website: investment-trusts.fidelity.co.uk/fidelity-japan-trust/

Fidelity Japan Trust (LSE: FJV) is a British investment trust dedicated to long term capital growth through investment in Japan. Launched in 1994, the company is listed on the London Stock Exchange. The chairman is David Graham and the Trust is managed by Nicholas Price of Fidelity International.

The fund won the Money Observer 2015 Investment Trust Awards: Premier Investment Trust Group. It changed its name from Fidelity Japanese Values to Fidelity Japan Trust in April 2018. In August 2025, the company announced that its assets would be transferred to the AVI Japan Opportunity Trust and that the Fidelity Japan Trust would then be liquidated.
