= FTSE AIM 100 Index =

Stock market index

The FTSE AIM 100 Index was introduced on 16 May 2005, and is a market-capitalisation-weighted stock market index. The index incorporates the largest 100 companies (by capitalisation) which have their primary listing on the Alternative Investment Market (AIM). It includes UK and international domiciled companies. The index is reviewed quarterly, and the constituent companies may change based on market capitalisation data as at the end of February, May, August and November. The index is maintained by FTSE Russell, a subsidiary of the London Stock Exchange Group.
