= Mid Wynd International Investment Trust =

- Company type: Public
- Traded as: LSE: MWY
- Industry: Investment management
- Founded: 1981
- Headquarters: Edinburgh, Scotland, UK
- Key people: Louis Florentin-Lee (Trust Manager) Barnaby Wilson (Trust Manager)
- Parent: Lazard Asset Management
- Website: www.lazardassetmanagement.com/uk/en_gb/investment-solutions/how-to-invest/mid-wynd-international-investment-trust-plc

The Mid Wynd International Investment Trust (LSE: MWY) is a publicly traded investment trust listed on the London Stock Exchange. Since 1 October 2023, The trust has been managed by Lazard Asset Management.

== History ==
The company can trace its origins back to 1797. David Scott, a weaver from Hawkhill near Dundee, bought a property on Mid Wynd in Dundee (Wynd meaning a narrow street) in order to establish a flax warping mill and hand weaving shed. For the next 150 years, the firm evolved, aided by colonialism, world-wide expansion and two world wars.

In 1949, following unwelcome recommendations from a Government-sponsored Jute Working Party Report, the company reorganised itself. The Mid Wynd Holding Co. Ltd. was established as the group parent company of a number of subsidiaries, including James Scott & Sons Ltd., the producing company, and Dura (Investments) Co. Ltd. which was to hold the financial reserves.

== Merger ==
Following a merger in 1965 of James Scott & Sons Ltd., Thomas Boag & Co. Ltd., and Robertson Industrial Textiles Ltd., Mid Wynd was left with Dura (Investments) Co. Ltd. and various subsidiaries. Over the next fifteen years, the company disposed of all its remaining assets with the exception of Dura (Investments).

Hampered by capital gains tax and a restricted market for its shares, in 1981 the company decided to seek a public quotation and to transform itself into an investment trust. Holdings of Dura (Investments) were to be transferred to Mid Wynd. The new trust would invest principally in smaller and less well-known growth companies traded in overseas stock-markets. To reflect this, the name of the company was changed to Mid Wynd International Investment Trust PLC. On 25 September 1981, shareholders approved the changes at a general meeting. In October of the same year, shares of the new company were introduced to the London Stock Exchange.

In 1998, the company amended its investment policy by removing its small-cap bias. In 2012 Mid Wynd's objective is to achieve capital and income growth by investing on a worldwide basis.
