= FTSE AIM UK 50 Index =

UK stock market index

- Foundation: May 16, 2005; 21 years ago
- Operator: FTSE Group
- Related indices: List: FTSE 100 Index; FTSE 250 Index; FTSE SmallCap; FTSE AIM 100 Index
- Website: www.londonstockexchange.com/indices/ftse-aim-uk-50-index

The FTSE AIM UK 50 Index was introduced on 16 May 2005, and is a market-capitalisation-weighted stock market index. The index incorporates the largest 50 UK companies (by capitalisation) which have their primary listing on the Alternative Investment Market (AIM).

It includes UK domiciled companies only. The index is reviewed quarterly, and the constituent companies may change based on market capitalisation data as at the end of February, May, August and November. The index is maintained by FTSE Russell, a subsidiary of the London Stock Exchange Group.

== See also ==
- FTSE 100
- FTSE 250
- FTSE AIM 100 Index
- FTSE AIM All-Share Index
