= FTSE AIM All-Share Index =

The FTSE AIM All-Share Index was revised from the previous FTSE AIM Index on 16 May 2005, and is a stock market index consisting of all companies quoted on the Alternative Investment Market which meet the requirements for liquidity and free float.

The index is reviewed quarterly, and the constituent companies may change based on market capitalisation data as at the end of February, May, August and November. The index is maintained by FTSE Russell, a subsidiary of the London Stock Exchange Group.
