= Chris Gibson-Smith =

British businessman (born 1945)

- Born: September 1945 (age 80)
- Education: Durham University; Newcastle University; Stanford University
- Occupation: Businessman
- Known for: Previous chairman of London Stock Exchange (2003–2015)

Chris Gibson-Smith CBE (born September 1945) is a British businessman who was chairman of the London Stock Exchange Group from 2003 to 2015.

== Education ==
Gibson-Smith studied at Durham University (University College), where he completed a BSc in Geology in 1967. He gained a PhD in Geochemistry from Newcastle University in 1970 and has also spent time at Stanford Business School.

== Career ==
A geologist by training, Gibson-Smith spent over 30 Years at BP, latterly as one of five group managing directors reporting to then CEO, Lord Browne.

During his time at the London Stock Exchange, Gibson-Smith oversaw a number of hostile bid defences, and the subsequent acquisitions of Italian stock exchange Borsa Italiana, FTSE International, LCH.Clearnet and Frank Russell Investments.

Since leaving the London Stock Exchange, Gibson-Smith has become an adviser to Swiss investment bank, UBS. He was succeeded as chairman of London Stock Exchange Group by Donald Brydon.

Gibson-Smith is also chairman of retirement specialist, Just Group plc. He also chaired National Air Traffic Services (Nats) from 2001 to 2005, and British Land from 2007 to 2012.
