= TAURUS =

Software system for the London Stock Exchange

TAURUS (Transfer and Automated Registration of Uncertified Stock) was a program that set out to transfer settlements of London Stock Exchange shares from transmission of paper share certificates to an automated system. TAURUS was intended to reduce the time taken and the cost of settlement, increasing convenience and reducing settlement risk.

It was started in the 1980s and was intended to replace the TALISMAN system, which was only available for settlement of trades between participating brokerage firms. TAURUS was also meant to change the London Stock Exchange settlement from a two-week account period, settling all trades that occurred within each two-week interval in one batch, to a rolling settlement system, settling all trades three business days after the date of the trade. The TAURUS project required software and hardware development but also required legal and other systemic changes, resulting in scope creep and cost overrun. TAURUS eventually cost £75 million and was replaced with the less-ambitious CREST system.

With seventeen proposed systems, the designers behind TAURUS tried to merge the ideas of the people involved, creating a Frankenstein's monster that resulted in costs estimated at £400 million to the stakeholders. The Sunday Times described its failure to build the system as "the beginning of the end for the London Stock Exchange".

The project was abandoned in March 1993.

== See also ==
- TradElect
- Settlement (finance)
