= Sangtae Kim =

American chemical engineer

Sangtae Kim (Korean: 김상태) is an American chemical engineer known for his contributions to microhydrodynamics, computational drug discovery, and cyberinfrastructure development. He currently serves as the Jay and Cynthia Ihlenfeld Head of the Davidson School of Chemical Engineering at Purdue University and as the Chief Technology Officer of the pharmaceutical company Verseon.

== Education and early career ==
Kim earned concurrent B.Sc. and M.Sc. degrees in Chemical Engineering from the California Institute of Technology in 1979 and completed his Ph.D. in Chemical Engineering at Princeton University in 1983, where he studied porous media flow under advisor William B. Russel.

== Academic and administrative roles ==
Kim began his academic career in 1983 at the University of Wisconsin–Madison, where he became Chair of the Department of Chemical Engineering from 1995 to 1997. He later joined Purdue University in 2003, where he currently leads the Davidson School of Chemical Engineering as the Jay and Cynthia Ihlenfeld Head since 2016.

In 2008, Kim was appointed as the founding executive director of the Morgridge Institute for Research, an interdisciplinary biomedical research institute based at the University of Wisconsin–Madison.

== Industry and public service ==
Kim has held senior leadership roles in the pharmaceutical industry, including Vice President positions at Eli Lilly and Warner-Lambert. In 2004, he was appointed Director of the Division of Shared Cyberinfrastructure at the National Science Foundation, overseeing major national cyberinfrastructure initiatives. In 2022, he was appointed Chief Technology Officer of Verseon, a pharmaceutical company focused on computational drug development.

== Honors and awards ==
Kim was elected to the National Academy of Engineering in 2001 and is a Fellow of the American Institute of Chemical Engineers and the American Institute for Medical and Biological Engineering.

In 2008 Kim was selected as one of the 100 Chemical Engineers of the Modern Era by the American Institute of Chemical Engineers for their Centennial Celebration, "Recognized for pharmaceutical radio frequency identification using fluidic self-assembly; suspension rheology computational methods."

Other notable awards include:

2013 Ho-Am Prize in Engineering "for global leadership in microhydrodynamics research, which deals with fluid behavior and control at small scales. Notably, Kim developed a fluidic self-assembly processes which has enabled ultra-low-cost manufacturing of radio frequency identification (RFID) tags."

1992 William O. Baker Award for Initiatives in Research "For his refinement of mathematical techniques in low Reynolds number hydrodynamics, and for his development of novel computer strategies for solving complex chemical engineering problems."

1985 Presidential Young Investigator Award in the category of chemical engineering, awarded by the National Science Foundation with a certificate signed by President Ronald Reagan

== Scientific contributions ==
In 2015, Kim solved a 140-year-old problem in fluid mechanics, related to the Stokes equation for ellipsoidal flow.

== Books ==
1. Kim, S. and Karrila, S.J. (1991) Microhydrodynamics: Principles & Selected Applications, Butterworth Heinemann, (original edition). Dover Publications Reprint Edition (2005)
2. Phan-Thien, N. and Kim, S. (1994) Microstructures in Elastic Media, Oxford University Press, New York.

== Selected publications ==
1. Kim, S., & Russel, W.B. (1985). The Hydrodynamic Interaction between Two Spheres in a Brinkman Medium. J. Fluid Mech. 154, 253–268.
2. Kim, S. (1987). Stokes Flow past Three Spheres: An Analytic Solution. Phys. Fluids 30, 2309–2314.
3. Brune, D.A., & Kim, S. (1993). Predicting Protein Diffusion Coefficients. Proc. Natl. Acad. Sci. USA 90, 3835–3839.
4. Rojnuckarin, A., Kim, S., & Subramaniam, S. (1998). Brownian Dynamics Simulations of Protein Folding. Proc. Natl. Acad. Sci. USA 95, 4288–4292.
5. Kim, S. (2015). Ellipsoidal Microhydrodynamics without Elliptic Integrals and How to Get There with Linear Operator Theory. Ind. Eng. Chem. Res. 54(38), 10497–10501. doi:10.1021/acs.iecr.5b02431
