= Raffaele Jerusalmi =

Italian executive (born 1961)

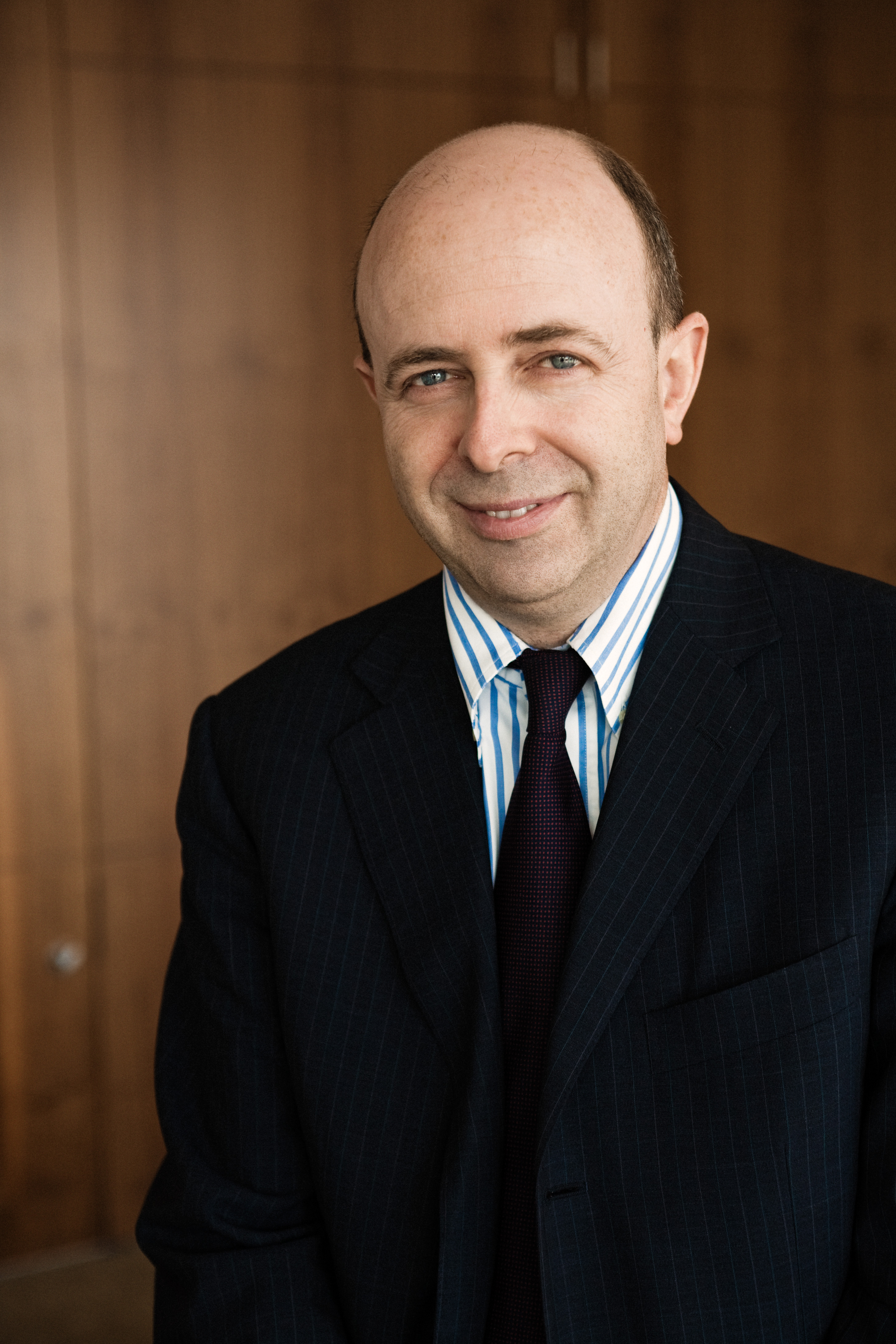
- Born: March 21, 1961 (age 64)
- Occupation: CEO of Borsa Italiana

Raffaele Jerusalmi (born March 21, 1961, in Milan) is an Italian executive and CEO of Borsa Italiana S.p.A.

== Education and career ==
After graduating in Economic and Social Disciplines at Bocconi University in 1988, Raffaele Jerusalmi started his career at Cimo S.p.A., in Milan. He, then, joined Credit Suisse First Boston in London heading trading for Italian fixed income securities from 1993 to 1998. In 1996 he also worked with the prop trading team.

He joined Borsa Italiana S.p.A. in 1998, serving as Executive Director responsible for capital markets, derivatives and fixed income until 2007. Following the merger between Borsa Italiana and the London Stock Exchange, he became Executive Committee Member and Global Director of Capital Markets of the Group and, in 2010, he was appointed board member and CEO of Borsa Italiana as well as board member of the London Stock Exchange Group.

Under his leadership, Borsa Italiana launched ELITE, a project implemented to support Italian SMEs through a portfolio of tools and services designed to boost their international growth. The ELITE program has been progressively exported in Europe and it currently counts more than 1200 companies from 42 Countries. Currently, Jerusalmi is also Deputy Chairman of MTS, Monte Titoli and Cassa di Compensazione & Garanzia as well as venture partner of Texas Capital Partners venture capital fund.

== Private life ==
Jerusalmi is married and has two daughters. Since his youth, he has a passion for chess: he was Italian Junior Champion at age 16 and he is Candidate Master of Chess at FIDE-World Chess Federation.
