= EKCO (disambiguation) =

EKCO is Eric Kirkham Cole Limited, a former British electronics and plastics manufacturer.

EKCO or Ekco may also refer to:

- EKCO Products Company, former American cookware manufacturer later rebranded as Ekco Group now a part of Corelle Brands
- Ekco Cloud, a European cloud and cybersecurity provider based in Dublin
