= Clara Furse =

British-Dutch businesswoman (1957)

Dame Clara Furse DBE
- Born: Clara Hedwig Frances Siemens; 16 September 1957 (age 68); Canada
- Occupation: Businesswoman
- Known for: First female CEO of the London Stock Exchange
- Spouse: Richard Furse (1981–present)
- Children: 3

Dame Clara Hedwig Frances Furse DBE (née Siemens; born 16 September 1957) was the Chief Executive of the London Stock Exchange between January 2001 and May 2009, and was the first woman to occupy the position. In 2005, she was ranked 19th in Fortune magazine's most powerful women in business list. In 2007, Furse was listed among Time's 100 most influential people in the world.

== Biography ==
Furse was born in Canada to Dutch parents, and educated at schools in Colombia, Denmark, and Britain. She graduated from the London School of Economics in 1979 with a BSc in economics.

Clara Furse was appointed Senior Independent Director and Deputy Chair of the Council of Lloyd's in May 2026. She is a non- executive Director of Assicurazioni Generali S.p.A. and the Chair of its Remuneration and Human Resources Committee. She joined the board of Société Générale S.A., as Chair of the Risk Committee in May 2026.

She was Chair of HSBC UK, the ring-fenced bank of the HSBC Group from April 2016 to April 2026. She was Chair of the UK Carbon Markets Forum from March 2021 to April 2026, establishing a group to operationalise a global, high integrity market for voluntary carbon credits.

From April 2013 until October 2016, she was an External Member of the Bank of England's Financial Policy Committee (FPC); a policymaker on the new statutory body and macro-prudential regulator.

She was a non-executive Director of Vodafone Group Plc from September 2014 to July 2023 and of Amadeus IT Group S.A. from April 2010 to June 2022. From June 2010 to March 2017, she was a non-executive Director of Nomura Holdings. For 6 years until April 2017, she was on the Board of the UK's Department for Work and Pensions and latterly its lead independent Director.

== Damehood ==
She was appointed Dame Commander of the Order of the British Empire (DBE) in the 2008 Birthday Honours.

== London Stock Exchange ==
Furse listed the 200-year-old exchange on its own market in 2001. Very strong growth followed a major technology upgrade to TradElect and an international focus to its listings business, which prompted a record five unsolicited or hostile bids in under two and half years from late 2004 to early 2007. Deutsche Boerse, Euronext, Macquarie, and Nasdaq (who twice failed to acquire the exchange despite garnering nearly 30% of the stock), launched bids at prices from £5.30 to £12.43. The exchange conducted an unprecedented number of successful bid defences before completing its merger with Borsa Italiana in October 2007, which provided the foundation for a diversification into derivatives, fixed income, clearing and settlement. TradElect proved to be decisive in the Exchange's exponential growth, achieving the best latencies of any major exchange in the world at the time. The Exchange recouped the £40m of investment in under 12 months, driving profit growth of 52% in its first full year (2007/08).

== Fortis ==
Furse was a non-executive Director of Fortis when the Belgian bank, in partnership with Royal Bank of Scotland and Santander, purchased ABN Amro in 2008. The acquisition led to the bailout of Fortis which was subsequently sold off in parts to the Belgian and Dutch states and BNP Paribas.

== See also ==
- Deutsche Börse
- Frankfurt Stock Exchange
