= Jerusalmi =

Jerusalmi is a surname. Notable people with the surname include:

- Myriam Fox-Jerusalmi (born 1961), French slalom canoeist
- Raffaele Jerusalmi (born 1961), Italian business executive
