= Ekco Cloud =

Irish IT Cloud and Cybersecurity company

Ekco Cloud Ltd
- Company type: Private
- Industry: IT
- Founded: 2017 in Dublin, Republic of Ireland
- Founders: Eoin Blacklock and Jonathan Crowe
- Headquarters: Malahide, Dublin, Republic of Ireland
- Key people: Eoin Blacklock; Jonathan Crowe; Don Robert
- Number of employees: 1000
- Website: www.ek.co

Ekco Cloud Ltd, trading as EKCO, is an IT cloud based services provider headquartered in Dublin, Republic of Ireland. The business was founded in 2017 as Internet Corp. by Eoin Blacklock and Jonathan Crowe, before rebranding as EKCO in 2020.

== History ==
Eoin Blacklock and Jonathan Crowe created the business in 2017, after previously setting up KeepItSafe, an IT cloud computing business. KeepItSafe was sold to US internet business J2 Global in 2010. Blacklock and Crowe stayed on at J2 Global, growing the business until they departed in 2016. When registering the business, they had planned to call the business Evil Internet Corp. as an inside joke about taking over the world referencing Austin Powers, but dropped the Evil when completing the registration. The new business was funded by €8 million brought in by IBI Corporate Finance, with a further €16 million provided by Ulster Bank. A further €8.4 million was raised by ACT Venture Capital in 2019. The finance raised was used to purchase four businesses in Netherlands, four in the United Kingdom, including Cloudhelix, and Datastring in Ireland over the first 2 1/2 years of operation. By 2020, the company provided cloud services to blue chip companies such as PostNL, Heineken, Schiphol airport in Amsterdam and CPL Resources and in February of that year renamed themselves as EKCO.

In 2021, EKCO purchased CTI Global, a cloud infrastructure and IT security firm owned by Denis O'Brien. The company grew further in June 2021 by purchasing cybersecurity provider Kontex Security, which with its earlier purchases of Ward Solutions and Caveo Systems, made it the second largest Irish owned business in the cybersecurity market. This was followed up in August with the purchase of cloud services business Unity Technology Solutions, increasing EKCO's annual turnover to €103 million. In October 2022, Corten Capital, a London-based private equity firm became its majority shareholder when they purchased a stake worth €300 million.

During February 2023, EKCO, Microsoft and the National Cyber Security Centre collaborated to launch a new Secure Configuration Framework for Microsoft Office 365. EKCO continued with their purchasing spree, buying Waterford based Radius Technologies, which specialised in end-to-end IT services for small to medium-sized businesses, and iSYSTEMS, a cloud migration and cyber security services company, making EKCO one of the fastest-growing managed cloud and security services providers in Europe. The purchase was followed up in December by buying Milton Keynes based Bluecube, an IT security services company, taking their employee count to 860 and revenue to over €150 million. In the same month, Don Robert, the chair of the London Stock Exchange and a co-founder of EKCO's largest shareholder Corten Capital, became chairman of the company while EKCO became Ireland's first IT cloud provider to be awarded Microsoft Managed Service Provider achieving all four of the Microsoft security specialisations. In April 2024, EKCO continued the purchasing streak by buying CTS Group, a provider of cloud and managed IT services to law firms and barristers in Britain and Ireland that had gone into administration. The purchase had taken EKCO staff numbers to over 1000.

In May 2025, Ekco appointed industry veteran Ben Savage as their new chief executive officer. A week later, Ekco announced the purchase of Manchester-based cyber security consultancy Predatech.
