= Millennium Exchange =

Electronic trading platform

- Developer(s): London Stock Exchange Group
- Operating system: Linux
- Platform: Commodity hardware
- Type: Electronic trading platform

Millennium Exchange is the electronic trading platform currently used and developed by the London Stock Exchange Group. It has also been sold and is in use by a number of other exchanges around the world.

== History ==
In 2009, the London Stock Exchange Group was unhappy with the cost and the insufficient speed of their electronic trading platform, TradElect, so after only two years of operating TradElect they decided to switch to a new platform. The LSE investigated the possibility of building a new system in-house, but eventually decided on acquiring the existing, Linux-based system, Millennium Exchange, which had a lower, sub-millisecond latency.

=== Acquisition ===
LSE acquired the system through acquisition of, Sri Lanka–based MillenniumIT – the original creators of the software, for £18m in 2009. In its annual report, the LSE said that it expected the switch to Millennium Exchange to save $16m per year starting from the 2012 financial year.

=== Software launch and initial problems ===
In October 2010, the London Stock Exchange claimed that Millennium Exchange had broken the world record for trade speed, with 126 microsecond trading times being recorded on the Turquoise dark pool trading venue, and said that it would go live on 1 November.

The system was taken out of service following a 2-hour outage of the Turquoise venue on 2 November 2010. The incident was, according to LSE officials, caused by human error that "may have occurred in suspicious circumstances." Plans were to introduce Millennium Exchange on the main share trading platform as well, in December. The LSE stated it was hoping the software would be ready for use again early in 2011.

=== Competing against specialist electronic rivals ===
In February 2011, the London Stock Exchange finished the switch to Linux. LSE chief executive Xavier Rolet said that the exchange, once a monopoly, would deliver record speed and stable trading in order to fight back against the fast erosion of its dominant marketshare by specialist electronic rivals.

== Users ==
As well as the London Stock Exchange the system has been sold to a number of other exchanges including BYMA - Argentina, Johannesburg Stock Exchange and the Bolsa de Valores de Lima. On January 22, 2019, the London Stock Exchange Group announced that its Millennium Exchange matching engine had been selected by the Hong Kong headquartered digital asset trade platform AAX. It is the first time LSEG technology is used to power a digital asset exchange.
