= David Schwimmer (banker) =

American banker and chief executive

- Born: April 12, 1969 (age 57); New York
- Education: Yale University (BA); Harvard University (JD); Tufts University (MA)
- Occupation: Banker
- Title: CEO, London Stock Exchange Group
- Term: 2018–

David Schwimmer (born April 12, 1969) is an American banker, and the chief executive (CEO) of the London Stock Exchange Group since April 2018, when he succeeded Xavier Rolet.

== Early life and education ==
Schwimmer is a native of New York. He attended Collegiate School and earned a bachelor's degree in English from Yale University, a J.D. degree from Harvard Law School, and a Masters in Law and Diplomacy from Fletcher School of Law and Diplomacy at Tufts University.

== Career ==
Schwimmer worked at the New York law firm Davis Polk & Wardwell as an associate. In 1998, he joined Goldman Sachs's Financial Institutions Group, focusing on market structure, brokerage, and trading. He became chief of staff to then President and COO Lloyd Blankfein in 2005, advising on the merger of the New York Stock Exchange and Archipelago. The next year, he was appointed head of Investment Banking in Russia and the Commonwealth of Independent States (CIS) and co-head of Goldman Sachs Russia. Elected partner in 2012. In 2017, he became global head of market structure and global head of metals and mining investment banking.

In April 2018, he was hired as chief executive of the London Stock Exchange Group, having worked as a banker for Goldman Sachs for twenty years. His appointment led to some surprise and humor due to confusion with the actor David Schwimmer of Friends.

== Personal life ==
Schwimmer is fluent in Russian, having worked in Moscow for three years running Goldman's Russian operation and as a reporter for NBC in 1991–92. In 2018, he moved to London when he assumed his role with the LSE.

A native New Yorker, Schwimmer is a New York Mets fan. He is married and has two sons.
