= Xavier Rolet =

French businessman

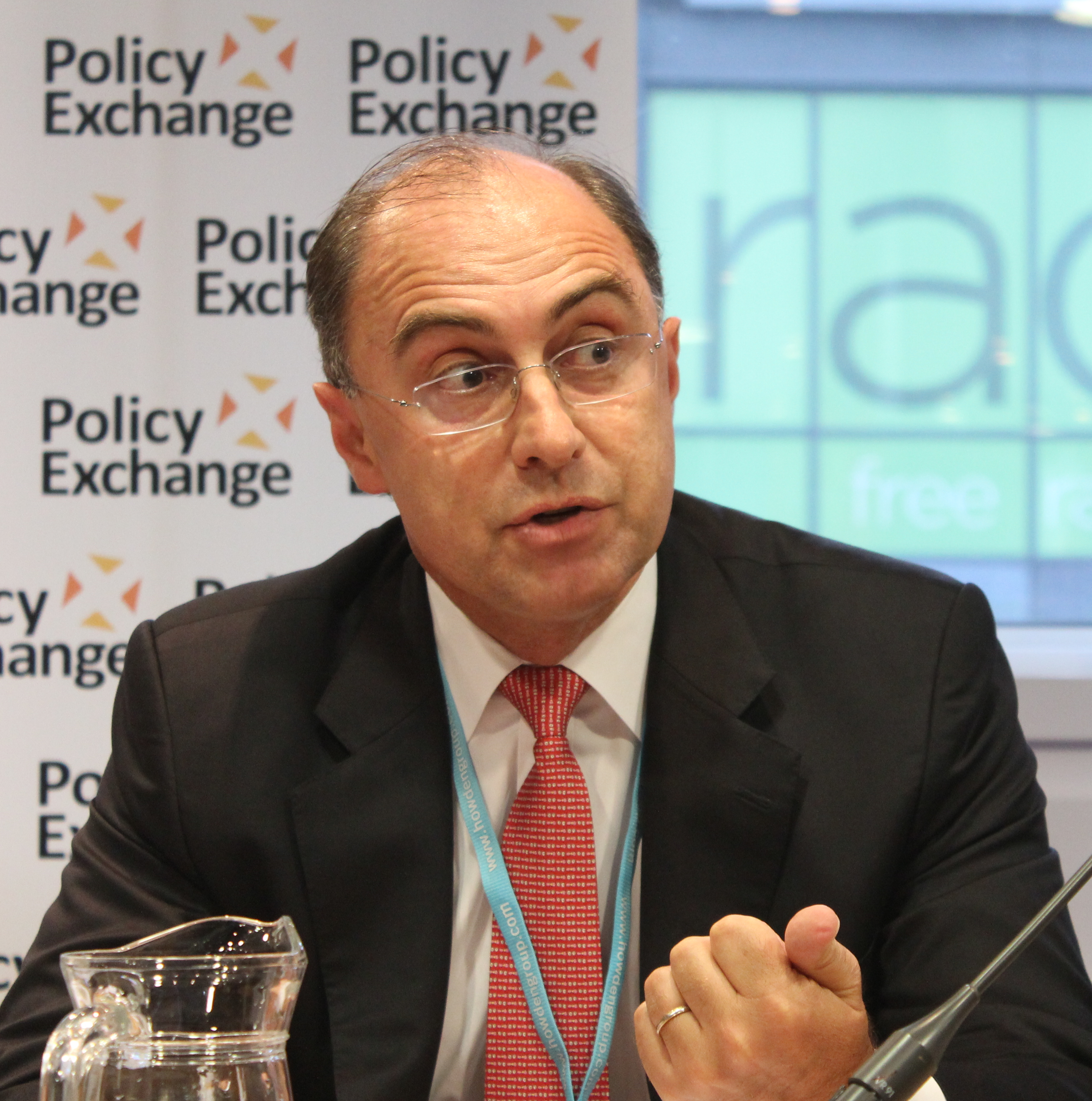
- Rolet in 2012
- Born: 12 November 1959 (age 66); Aix-les-Bains, France
- Education: Harvard University Columbia University Graduate School of Business (MBA); IHEDN; KEDGE Business School

Xavier R. Rolet (born 12 November 1959) is a Franco-American businessman, chairman of technology firm Prytek, a Harvard University Senior Fellow, a Yale University Center for Business and the Environment board member, managing partner of Grayling Centennial LLC, board member of Old Salt Co-Op, a Montana ranching Co-operative, chairman and chief executive officer (CEO) of World Quantum Growth Acquisition Corporation, a NYSE-listed company (WQGA.U). He was CEO of CQS until January 2020, and before that, CEO of the London Stock Exchange Group. He was included in the 2017 Harvard Business Review's List of the Best 100 CEOs in the World and is a frequent speaker at business events. Rolet is an advocate for supporting start-ups and the funding of SMEs to promote innovation and job creation.

== Early life ==
Rolet was born in Aix-les-Bains, France. He is the eldest of three children born to military parents. His early life was spent in Algeria and France. After graduating from the KEDGE Business School with an MSc in management science and finance in 1981, he served as a second lieutenant and Instructor at the French Air Force Academy, earned an MBA from Columbia Business School in 1984 and a post-graduate degree from Paris-based IHEDN (Institute of Advanced Studies in National Defence) in April 2008.

== Career ==
From 1984–1994, Rolet worked at Goldman Sachs in New York and London. At Goldman, he started on the international arbitrage desk in New York. Then he joined Credit Suisse First Boston as Global Head of European Equities in 1994, working there until 1996. After that, Rolet worked at Dresdner Kleinwort Benson from 1997–2000 as Global Head of Risk and Trading.

He then worked at Lehman Brothers from 2000–2008, in New York, as co-head of global equity trading, in London, as head of European and Asian equities, and in Paris, as CEO of Banque Lehman Brothers. He joined the Board of the London Stock Exchange in March 2009 and became CEO in May. Rolet is noted for transforming the London Stock Exchange during his time as CEO. He pioneered the ‘Open Access’ model which revolutionised and opened the Exchange Industry’s traditional vertical silos and is now enshrined in the new MiFIR European legislation which took effect on January 3, 2018, allowing customers to pick and choose which parts of the exchange they want to use, and also embarked on £3.5 billion of deals.

Under his leadership, the London Stock Exchange Group acquired MillenniumIT (2009), Turquoise Holdings Ltd (2010), FTSE Group (2011), TRS (2011), GATElab Srl (2012), EuroTLX Srl (2013), LCH.Clearnet (2013), Bonds.com (2014), Exactpro (2015), XTF (2015) and the Frank Russell Company (2014) from Northwestern Mutual, the Asset management arm of which was sold in October 2015 to TA Associates and Reverence Capital Partners. In 2016, he acquired Mergent, Inc. and the Yield-Book & Citigroup’s Global Fixed Income Index Business from Citigroup, making FTSE Russell the largest Index Company in the World with ca $15 Trillion of Assets under benchmark. As per data released on 8 January 2018 by LCH, London Stock Exchange Group's regulated entities traded, cleared and settled in excess of $1 Quadrillion of notional contracts and securities, making the London Stock Exchange Group one of the very largest financially systemic Institutions in the World.

In October 2015, LSE Group launched Curve Global, a new Futures Exchange co-owned with Barclays Bank, Bank of America, Citi, Goldman, Sachs, Societe Generale, BNP Paribas and the Chicago Board Options Exchange. In March 2016, the company announced it had reached an agreement with Deutsche Boerse AG to merge. The merger attempt was blocked by EU Regulator stating "The Commission's investigation concluded the merger would have created a de facto monopoly in the markets for clearing fixed income instruments".

He took the firm from £800 million to £14 billion in value during his tenure and was ranked as one of the best 100 CEOs in the world in 2017 by the Harvard Business Review.

In November 2017, Rolet announced that he would be stepping down as CEO of the London Stock Exchange Group. Under his leadership, the value of London Stock Exchange Group rose from ca £800 Mln to £14Bln shortly before the announcement of his departure.

In April 2018, it was announced that Rolet would join the board of PhosAgro as a non-executive director.

In November 2018, it was announced that Rolet would join the Board of Verseon as a non-executive director.

Rolet was a keynote speaker at the first European Securities and Markets Authority conference that was held in Paris.

Rolet delivered an address at the St Petersburg International Economic Forum. He was a panellist at the Bank of England’s Open Forum event.

Rolet contributed an article, Making capitalism popular again: learning the lessons from Lehman, to the Labour in the City Anthology, which was published in October 2018 to commemorate ten years since the Lehman Bros bankruptcy and launched at the City Corporation by Alistair Darling. On 21 December 2018 it was announced that Rolet was appointed as the new Chief Executive Officer of CQS (Asset Manager), an $18 Bln Alternative Asset Management Company founded in 1999 by Michael Hintze.

== Awards and appointments ==
He was a board member of LCH.Clearnet and MTS Group and is a Board member of Columbia Business School, a former vice-chairman of the World Federation of Exchanges WFE, an honorary fellow (FCSI/Hon) of the Chartered Institute for Securities and Investment CISI and a member of Her Majesty's Treasury's Financial Services Trade and Investment Board.

Since October 2017, he is a member of the Committee of Expert Advisers at the Department for International Trade. He was a member of Prime Minister David Cameron's Business Advisory Group, and is a member of the Governor of the Bank of England's Financial Services Forum and of the Bank of England's Open Forum. In October 2015, he was appointed an Honorary Knight Commander of the Order of the British Empire (KBE) by Queen Elizabeth II.

In December 2015, he was appointed Echansonnier 'A Camera Paramenti ' of the Echansonnerie de Châteauneuf-du-Pape. He was made a Knight of the National Order of the Legion of Honour of France in January 2016. In 2016, Rolet was listed by UK-based company Richtopia in the global list of 500 most influential CEOs in the world.

In July 2016, Rolet was made an Officer of Morocco's Royal Sharifian Order of Al-Alaoui (Order of Ouissam Alaouite).

In 2017, Debretts named Rolet in their list of the most influential people in finance. He appeared in the Evening Standard list of London's 1,000 most influential people for several years. He was named in the 2017 Harvard Business Review's List of the Best 100 CEOs in the World, was awarded a 2018 Lifetime Achievement Award by Risk magazine and the 2017 Lifetime Achievement Award by Futures and Options World.

In December 2017, he was awarded the Order of Friendship (Орден Дружбы) of the Russian Federation.

== Personal ==
He has competed in several editions of the Dakar Rally, finishing 82nd (out of 575 crew on the starting line) in the 2009 edition with co-pilot Jean-Louis Juchault.

Rolet is the co-founder of Chêne Bleu wine, which is produced at La Verrière in France. Rolet renovated the estate and replanted vines during the mid-90s. Chêne Bleu is run by Rolet’s wife, Nicole. The wine went in to production in 2006 and the first reds were released in 2010. Journalists have since dubbed Chêne Bleu as the first Super Rhône. It is made to organic and biodynamic principles. Every year La Verrière hosts an Extreme Wine course, which takes place over a week and includes a series of lectures and tastings.
