= London Stock Exchange Group =

British financial services company

London Stock Exchange Group plc

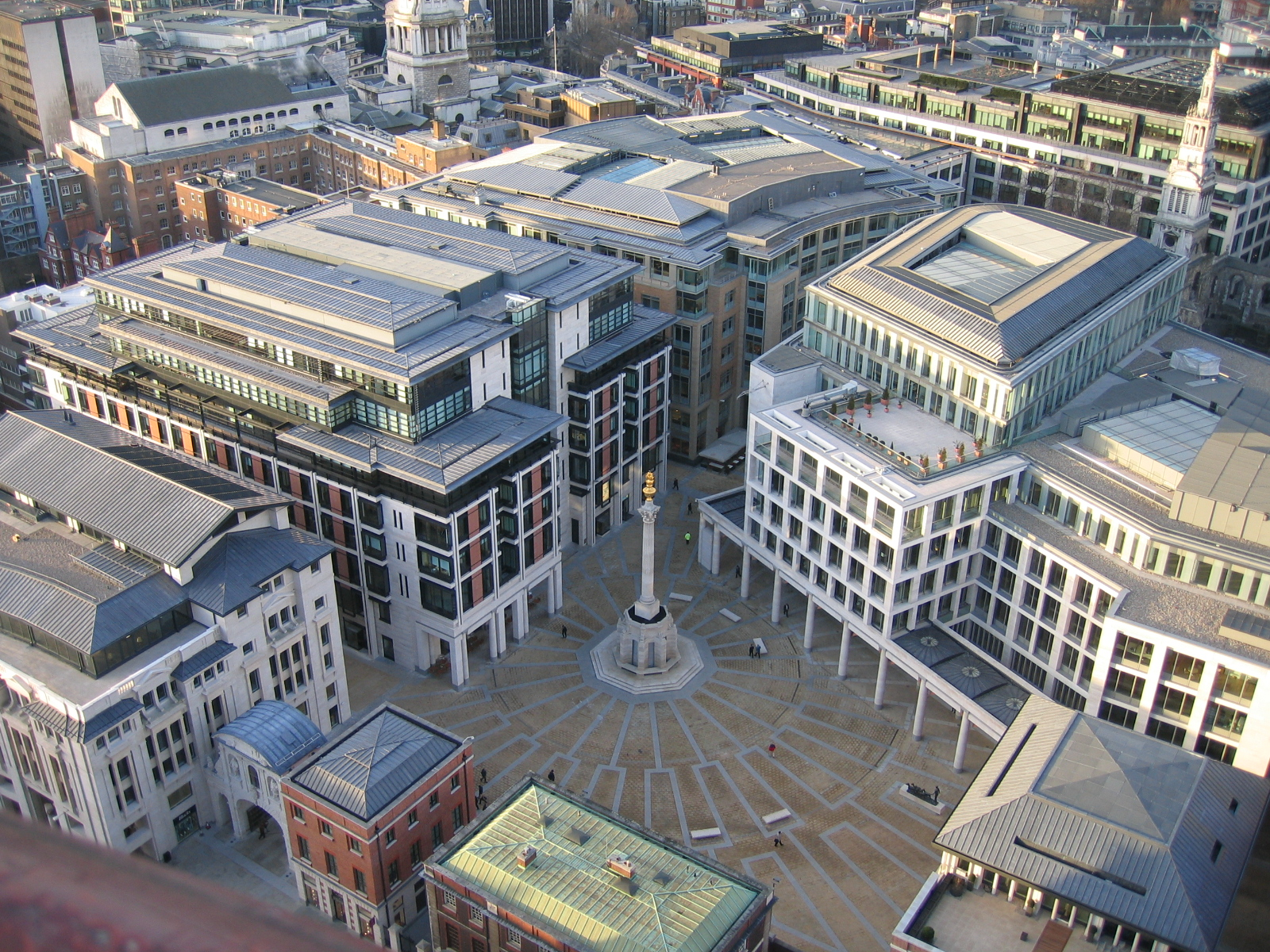
- Headquarters at Paternoster Square
- Formerly: Milescreen Limited (February–November 2005); LSEG Group Limited (November–December 2005)
- Type: Public
- Traded as: LSE: LSEG; FTSE 100 Component
- Industry: Financial services
- Founded: 18 February 2005; 21 years ago
- Headquarters: Paternoster Square; London, England, UK
- Key people: Don Robert (Chairperson); David Schwimmer (CEO)
- Products: Financial markets infrastructure; Data analytics; Clearing; Indices; Risk Screening
- Revenue: ▲£9.081 billion (2025)
- Operating income: ▲£2.127 billion (2025)
- Net income: ▲£1.506 billion (2025)
- Divisions: Data and Analytics; Markets; Risk Intelligence; FTSE Russell
- Website: lseg.com

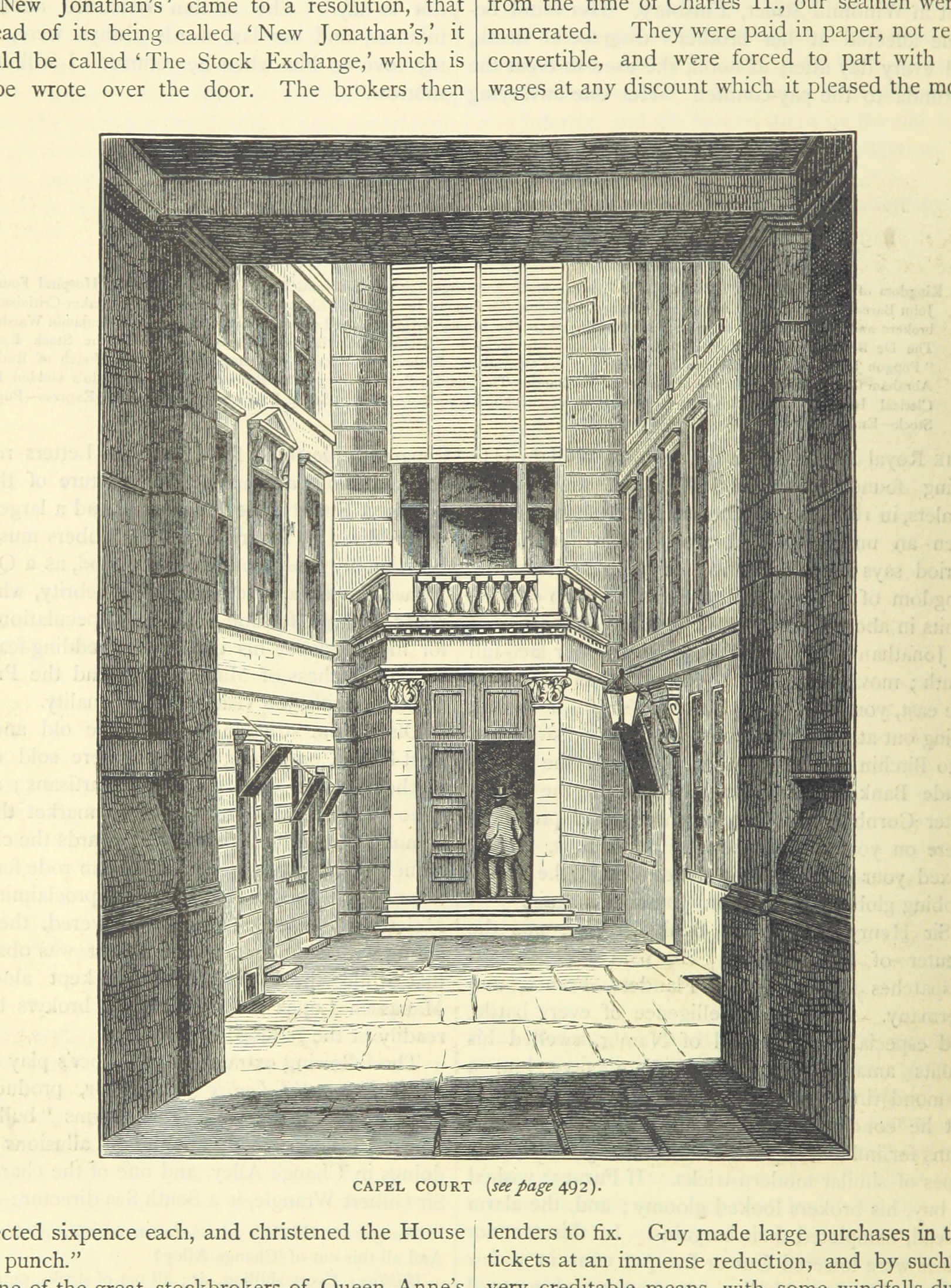
London Stock Exchange, Capel Court, in use from 1802 to 1972

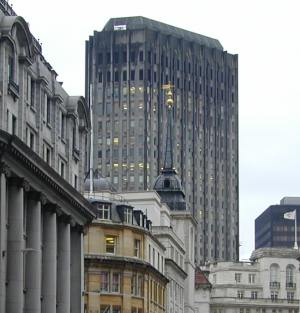
Former premises in Threadneedle Street, in use from 1972 to 2004

London Stock Exchange Group plc (LSEG) is a British global provider of financial markets data and infrastructure headquartered in London, England. It owns the London Stock Exchange (on which it is also listed), Refinitiv, LSEG Technology, FTSE Russell, and majority stakes in LCH and Tradeweb.

== History ==
The London Stock Exchange was founded in Sweeting's Alley in London in 1801 and moved to Capel Court the following year. In 1972, the Exchange moved to a new purpose-built building and trading floor in Threadneedle Street. Deregulation, sometimes known as "big bang", came in 1986 and external ownership of member firms was allowed for the first time. In 1995, the Alternative Investment Market was launched.

In 2001, the exchange became a public limited company, London Stock Exchange plc, floating with a market capitalisation of £1.1bn. The Exchange moved again, in 2004, this time to Paternoster Square. The company rejected a takeover bid from Deutsche Börse worth £1.3 billion in December 2004, and from Macquarie worth £1.5 billion in December 2005.

Between April and May 2006, having been rebuffed in an informal approach, Nasdaq built up a 23% stake in the Exchange. The stake grew to 29% as a result of the London exchange's share consolidation. Nasdaq has since sold its investment.

In 2007, the Exchange acquired the Milan-based Borsa Italiana for €1.6bn (£1.1bn; US$2bn) to form the London Stock Exchange Group plc (LSEG). The combination was intended to diversify the LSE's product offering and customer base. The all-share deal diluted the stakes of existing LSE shareholders, with Borsa Italiana shareholders receiving new shares representing 28 per cent of the enlarged register. On 16 September 2009, LSEG agreed to acquire Millennium Information Technologies, Ltd., a Sri Lankan-based software company specialising in trading systems, for US$30m (£18m). The acquisition was completed on 19 October 2009.

On 9 February 2011, TMX Group, operator of the Toronto Stock Exchange agreed to join forces with LSEG in a deal described by TMX head Tom Kloet as a 'merger of equals' (though 8/15 board members of the combined entity will be appointed by LSE, 7/15 by TMX). The deal, subject to government approval would create the world's largest exchange operator for mining stocks. In the UK, the LSE Group first announced it as a takeover, however in Canada the deal was reported as a merger. The provisional name for the combined group would be LTMX Group plc. On 13 June 2011, a rival, and hostile bid from the Maple Group of Canadian interests, was unveiled for the TMX Group. This was a cash and stock bid of CA$3.7 billion, launched in the hope of blocking the LSE Group's takeover of TMX. The group was composed of the leading banks and financial institutions of Canada. The London Stock Exchange however announced it was terminating the merger with TMX on 29 June 2011 citing that "LSEG and TMX Group believe that the merger is highly unlikely to achieve the required two-thirds majority approval at the TMX Group shareholder meeting".

In December 2011, LSEG announced it had agreed to acquire the 50% stake in the global index business FTSE International Ltd (FTSE) that the Group did not already own. LSEG agreed to acquire the stake for a total cash consideration of £450 million.

In July 2012, the LSE bought a 5% stake in Delhi Stock Exchange.

On 2 June 2014, the LSE became the 10th stock exchange to join the United Nations' Sustainable Stock Exchanges (SSE) initiative.

On 26 June 2014, the LSE announced it had agreed to buy Frank Russell Co., making it one of the largest providers of index services. In January 2015, Reuters reported that LSEG planned to put Russell Investments up for sale, and estimates the sale will produce $1.4 billion.

In March 2016, the company announced it had reached an agreement with Deutsche Börse to merge. The companies would have been brought under a new holding company, UK TopCo, and would retain both headquarters in London and Frankfurt. On 25 February 2017, LSEG stated it would not sell its fixed-income trading platform in Italy to Deutsche Börse AG, to appease anti-trust concerns. The planned merger between the two exchanges, which was estimated to create the largest exchange in Europe, was subsequently described as "at risk" by the Wall Street Journal. The merger attempt was blocked by EU Competition Regulator on 29 March 2017 stating that "The Commission's investigation concluded the merger would have created a de facto monopoly in the markets for clearing fixed income instruments".

Thomson Reuters sold a 55% majority stake in its Financial & Risk (F&R) unit to private equity firm Blackstone Group LP on October 1, 2018, in a deal which valued the total F&R business at about $20 billion. This business was formed into Refinitiv. In August 2019, LSEG agreed to buy Refinitiv in an all-share transaction valuing the target at $27 billion. Shortly thereafter, on 11 September 2019, LSEG itself became the target of a £32 billion bid by the Hong Kong Exchanges and Clearing, subject to abandoning its plans to buy Refinitiv. LSEG rejected the takeover bid two days later. In order to secure the Refinitiv deal, in July 2020, LSEG announced that it was considering selling its Italian assets including MTS, Italian bond trading venue and potentially Borsa Italiana.

On 18 September 2020, LSEG entered into exclusive talks to sell the Italian Bourse to Euronext. The acquisition was announced on 9 October of that same year and was completed on 29 April 2021. David Craig became CEO of Refinitiv once the deal was completed and continued in that role until he left the business at the end of 2021.

In August 2023, LSEG announced its intention to retire the Refinitiv name across the group, starting with market-data terminal Refinitiv Workspace, which was to become LSEG Workspace from the end of August 2023. In January 2026, LSEG launched a new digital settlement service, Digital Settlement House (LSEG DiSH), to enable programmatic and instantaneous settlement between independent payment networks, both on and off chain.

== Leadership ==
The positions of chairman and Chief Executive of the London Stock Exchange Group were founded in 2007, upon the establishment of the Group. This is not to be confused with the chairmen and Chief Executive's of the London Stock Exchange plc, which is a subsidiary of the Group. The current Chief Executive is former Goldman Sachs banker David Schwimmer, who was appointed in 2018, replacing Xavier Rolet, who was ousted in November 2017. Schwimmer's most recent role at Goldman Sachs was serving as "global head of market structure and global head of metals and mining in investment banking".

=== Senior leadership ===
- Chairman: Don Robert (since January 2019)
- Chief Executive: David Schwimmer (since April 2018)

=== List of former chairmen ===
1. Chris Gibson-Smith (2007–2015)
2. Sir Donald Brydon (2015–2018)

=== List of former chief executives ===
1. Dame Clara Furse (2007–2009)
2. Xavier Rolet (2009–2017)

== Operations ==
Following the merger with Borsa Italiana, the group is Europe's leading equities business, with 48% of the FTSEurofirst 100 by market capitalisation and with the most liquid order book by value and volume traded. Its activities include:

- London Stock Exchange: The London Stock Exchange is Europe's leading stock exchange and is owned by the London Stock Exchange Group plc.
- LSEG Technology: LSEG Technology was acquired by LSEG in 2009 as their technology service provider. The company was originally known as MillenniumIT and was subsequently rebranded as LSEG Technology. It offers a trading platform known as Millennium Exchange and is available for use at most of the leading stock markets in the world.
- Cassa di Compensazione e Garanzia ('CC&G'): CC&G provides central counterparty services. It was purchased along with Borsa Italiana in 2007.
- Monte Titoli: Monte Titoli is the Italian Central Securities Depository for Italian issued financial instruments. It performs pre-settlement, settlement and custody services for its member participants. It was created in 1978 and acquired by the Borsa Italiana in 2002 before becoming part of LSEG.
- Turquoise: On 21 December 2009, the LSE agreed to take a 60% stake in rival trading platform Turquoise, which currently has a 7% share of the market. Turquoise will be merged with the LSE's trading facility Baikal Global.
- LCH: On 3 April 2012, LSE and LCH shareholders voted overwhelmingly to take up to 60 percent of the clearing operator with an offer of 20 euros per share, which valued LCH at 813 million euros ($1.1 billion).
- FTSE Russell: Through its acquisition of the Frank Russell Company in 2015, London Stock Exchange Group combined FTSE Group with Russell Indexes to form FTSE Russell, now one of the largest index providers in the world.
- Mergent: On 21 November 2016 LSEG announced plans to acquire Mergent Inc, provider of business and financial information on public and private companies.
- The Yield Book and Citi Fixed Income Indices: On 30 May 2017 LSEG announced the acquisition of The Yield Book and Citi Fixed Income Indices, leading providers of fixed income analytics systems, for $685 million.
- AAX: On 22 January 2019, LSEG announced that its Millennium Exchange matching engine technology had been selected by digital asset exchange AAX, marking the first time its solutions are applied in the digital assets economy.
- In September 2023, LSEG drew up plans for a new digital markets business to offer trading of traditional financial assets using blockchain technology. The new entity is expected to be launched within a year.

== Arms ==
Coat of arms of London Stock Exchange Group
Notes Granted 26 May 2023 by the College of Arms. Crest None recorded Helm None recorded, as per usual Escutcheon Azure a Lion passant guardant Or armed proper surmounting the base of a Tower also Proper. Supporters On either side a Griffin Sable armed proper murally crowned Or. Badge Within a Circlet of Annulets interlaced a Balance Azure.

== See also ==
- Market maker
- Alternative Investment Market
- CCP Global
