= TradElect =

Defunct electronic trading platform of the London Stock Exchange

- Developer: Accenture
- Initial release: June 2007
- Final release: ? / February 2011; 15 years ago
- Operating system: Microsoft Windows
- Platform: .NET
- Type: Electronic trading platform

TradElect was the London Stock Exchange's main electronic trading platform from 2007 to 2011. It ran on HP ProLiant servers running Windows Server 2003, using .NET technology and Microsoft SQL Server 2000. Its development took four years from project inception to rollout and had a total cost of £40 million.

The impetus for the development of TradElect was the rise of algorithmic trading and the liberalisation of the trading sector in Europe due to the Markets in Financial Instruments Directive. Both of these factors meant that stock exchanges – previously facing little or no competition – had to offer faster response times to be competitive. The system which TradElect replaced, Sets, was 10 years old and took 140 ms to complete a trade, compared to TradElect's 10 ms. Infolect, an integrated part of TradElect, is used for dissemination of market data.

In April 2010 the Oslo Stock Exchange also adopted TradElect, as part of a strategic partnership agreement. The Johannesburg Stock Exchange also adopted TradElect in 2007.

== Downtime ==
On 8 September 2008, TradElect trading was mostly unavailable for over 7 hours, on what the Wall Street Journal described as a "huge trading day". Traders walked out of the London Stock Exchange in protest. Another major technical fault had occurred less than a year earlier.

The London Stock Exchange claimed that the TradElect software was not to blame, instead blaming an unspecified fault with "network software". However, Celent analyst Cubillas Ding noted that this outage, and three previous ones, all coincided with large spikes in trading volumes, from different economic events, and concluded that the LSE's technology could not cope with the high trading volumes.

Microsoft had previously used TradElect as a case study in marketing material to position its Windows operating system as suitable for "highly reliable" systems. It did not respond to requests for comment.

== Successor ==
In May 2009, the London Stock Exchange gained a new CEO, Xavier Rolet, who set about reviewing costs and cutting jobs. Only two years after TradElect had first gone live, the London Stock Exchange decided to scrap it and replace it with something else. The LSE investigated the possibility of building a new system in-house, but eventually decided on acquiring the existing, Linux-based system Millennium Exchange, which had a lower, sub-millisecond latency. It acquired this system by acquiring the company that created it, MillenniumIT, in 2009, for £18 million. In its annual report, the LSE said that it expected the switch to Millennium Exchange to save $16 million per year starting from the 2012 financial year.

By 2011, TradElect had been completely replaced with Millennium Exchange at the London Stock Exchange.

The Oslo Stock Exchange and the Johannesburg Stock Exchange also switched to Millennium Exchange.
