= Don Robert =

American businessman (born 1959)

- Born: Donald A. Robert; 15 May 1959 (age 67); Portland, Oregon, US
- Education: Oregon State University
- Occupation: Businessman
- Title: Chairman of London Stock Exchange Group
- Term: 2019–
- Predecessor: Donald Brydon
- Spouse: Jennifer Robert
- Children: 2

Donald A. Robert (born 15 May 1959) is an American businessman who is the chairman of London Stock Exchange Group since May 2019. He was the chairman of Experian, an information services group with, from 2014 to 2019. He is also currently Chair of Council at the London School of Hygiene and Tropical Medicine.

== Early life ==
Robert was educated at Benson Polytechnic High School and has a BSc degree in business administration from Oregon State University.

== Career ==
Robert began his career as a trainee at US Bancorp, where he managed loans for car dealers in Portland. He then took charge of its specialist credit recording division, Credco. After the division was sold to First American Financial Corporation in 1995, he led mortgage origination services there.

He joined Experian North America in 2001 and was chief executive of Experian (in London) from 1 January 2007 until July 2014, when he was appointed chairman and replaced by Brian Cassin as chief executive.

In December 2018, London Stock Exchange Group announced that he would be appointed as a non-executive director on 1 January 2019. He became chairman in May 2019, succeeding Donald Brydon.

In 2023, Roberts became chair of Ekco, a cloud service provider.

== Personal life ==
He and his wife Jennifer have two children.
