= London Stock Exchange =

Stock exchange in the City of London

Coordinates: 51°30′55″N 0°05′57″W

- Arms

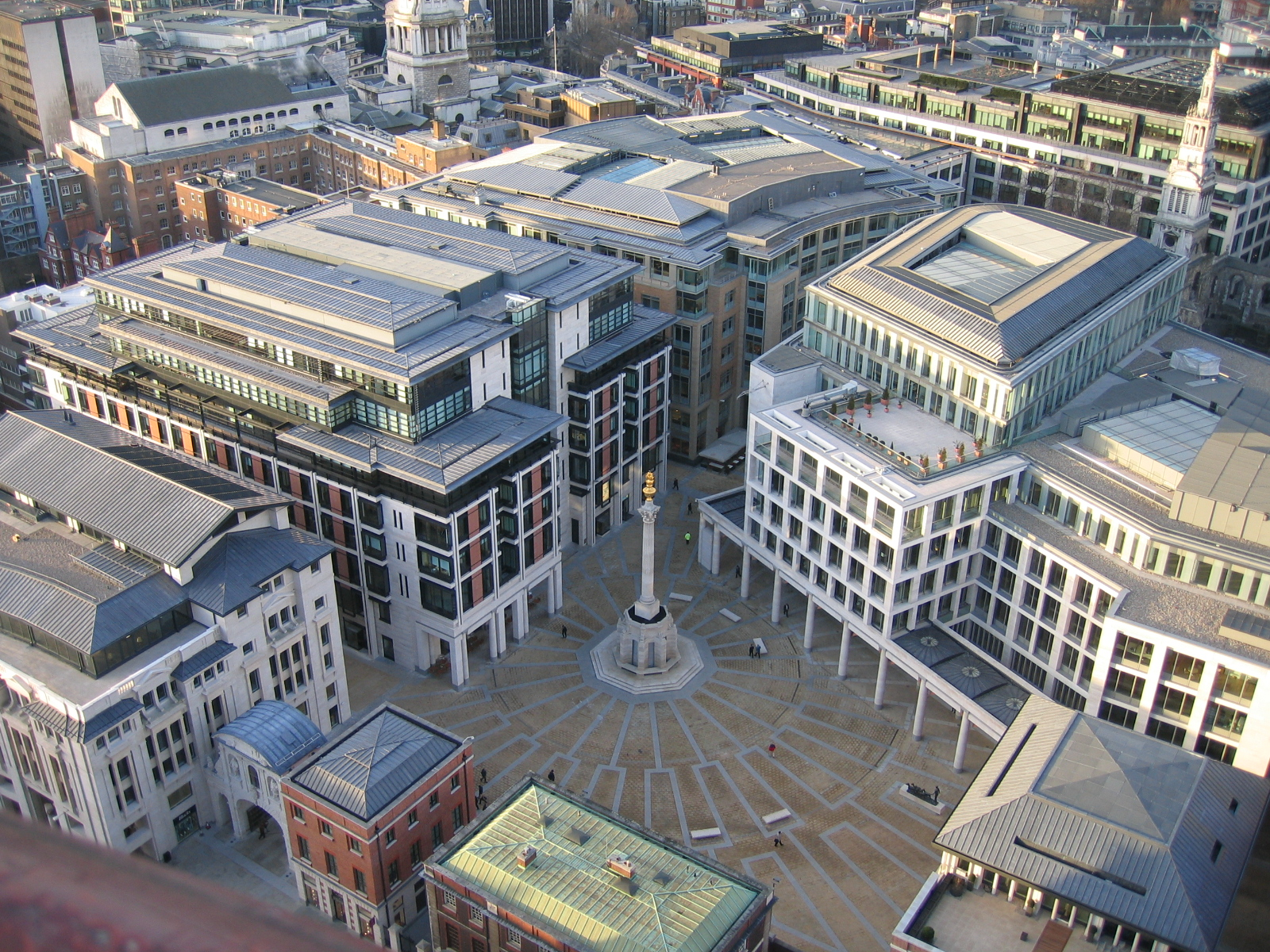
- The Stock Exchange on the right, facing Paternoster Square
- Type: Stock exchange
- Location: London, England, UK
- Founded: 30 December 1801; 224 years ago
- Owner: London Stock Exchange Group
- Key people: Don Robert (Chairman); Julia Hoggett (CEO)
- Currency: Sterling (most primary listings; stock prices are quoted in pence rather than pounds)
- No. of listings: 1,918 issuers
- Market cap: US$3.42 trillion (as of July 2024)
- Indices: FTSE 100 Index; FTSE 250 Index; FTSE 350 Index; FTSE SmallCap Index; FTSE All-Share Index; FTSE Fledgling Index
- Website: www.londonstockexchange.com

The London Stock Exchange (LSE) is a global stock exchange based in Paternoster Square in the City of London, England. Founded in 1801, it is one of the world's oldest continuously operating stock exchanges. As of mid-2025, the exchange had a total market capitalisation of approximately US$5.9 trillion for all listed instruments. Since 2007, it has been operated by the London Stock Exchange Group (LSEG), which is itself a constituent of the FTSE 100 Index and trades under the ticker symbol LSEG.

The exchange hosts over 1,900 companies from more than 60 countries, operating several key equity and debt markets, including its Main Market for established global companies and the Alternative Investment Market (AIM) for smaller, high-growth firms. It also serves as a primary venue for Global Depositary Receipts (GDRs), providing a critical gateway for firms from emerging markets—particularly India, China, and the Middle East—to access international capital. The exchange is a global centre for the Natural Resources sector; as of 2025, London maintains the world's largest concentration of mining capital, with a sectoral market capitalisation of approximately US$600 billion, representing roughly 13% of the global mining market.

Despite challenges following Brexit, the LSE regained its position as Europe's largest stock market by total market value in 2024 and 2025, bolstered by a record-breaking performance in its flagship FTSE 100 index, which surpassed the 10,000-point milestone for the first time in early 2026.

== History ==
=== Coffee House ===
The Royal Exchange was founded by the English financier Thomas Gresham and Sir Richard Clough on the model of the Stock Exchange in Antwerp. It was opened by Queen Elizabeth I in 1571.

In the 17th century, stockbrokers were not allowed in the Royal Exchange due to their perceived rude manners. They had to operate from other establishments in the vicinity, notably Jonathan's Coffee-House. At that coffee house, a broker named John Castaing started listing the prices of a few commodities including salt, coal, paper, and exchange rates in 1698. Originally, this was not a daily list and was only published a few days of the week.

This list and activity was later moved to Garraway's coffee house. Public auctions during this period were conducted for the duration that a length of tallow candle could burn. These were known as "by inch of candle" auctions. As stocks grew, with new companies joining to raise capital, the royal court also raised some monies. These are the earliest evidence of organised trading in marketable securities in London.

=== Royal Exchange ===
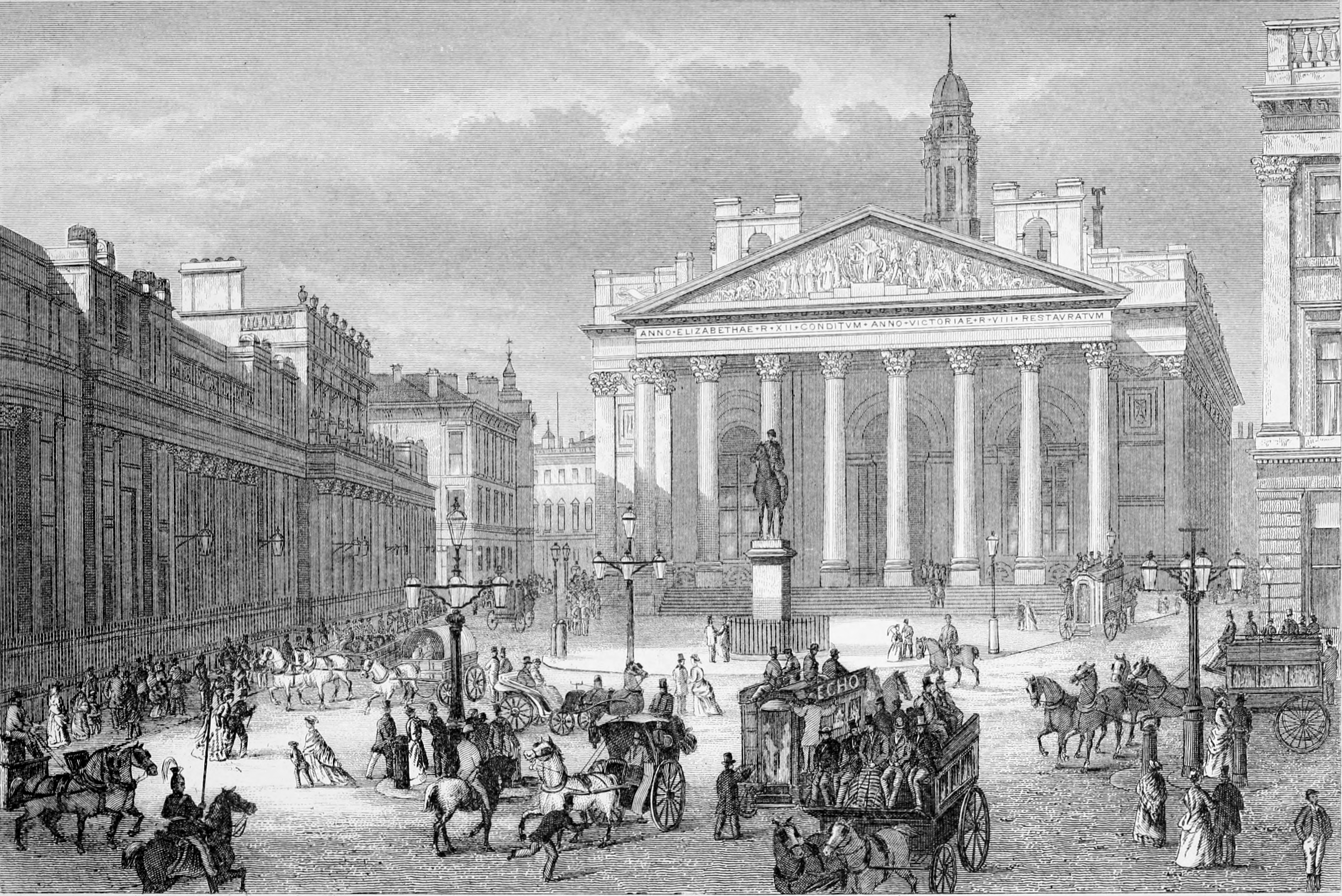
The Royal Exchange building in 1889

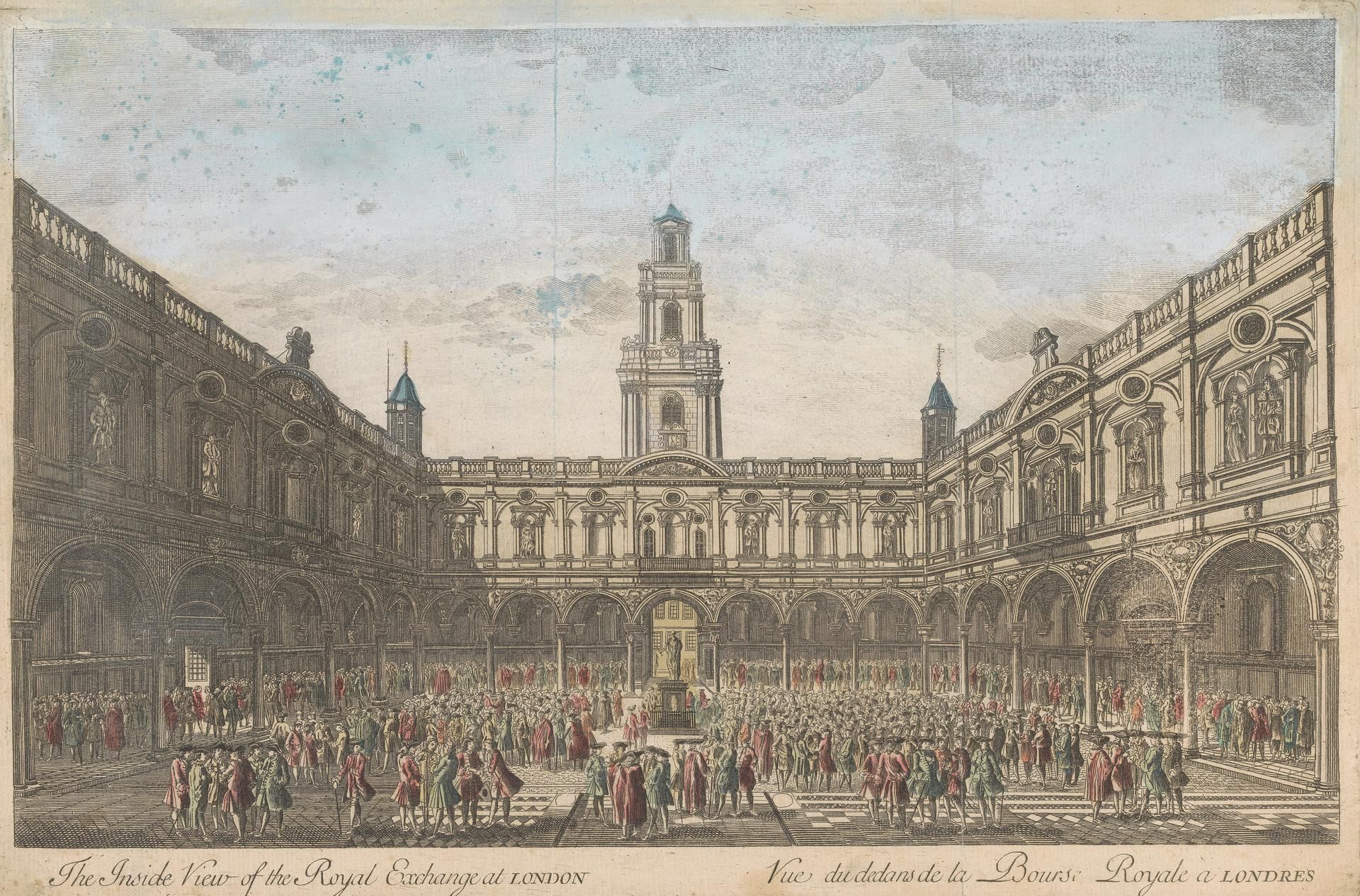
The Inside View of the Royal Exchange at London, 18th century

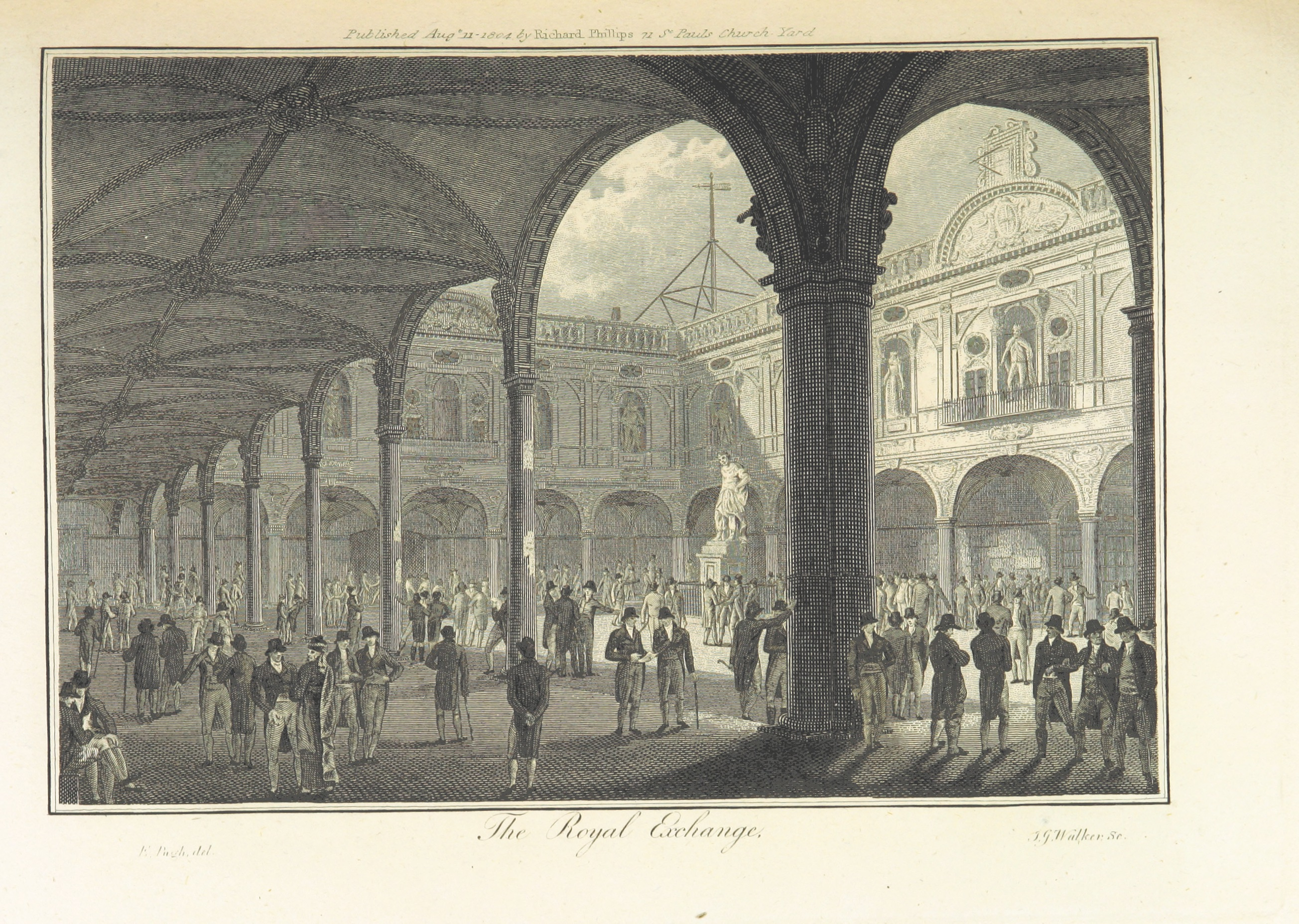
The Royal Exchange in 1804

After Gresham's Royal Exchange building was destroyed in the Great Fire of London, it was rebuilt and re-established in 1669. This was a move away from coffee houses and a step towards the modern model of stock exchange.

The Royal Exchange housed brokers, merchants and merchandise. This was the birth of a regulated stock market, which had teething problems in the shape of unlicensed brokers. In order to regulate these, Parliament passed an Act in 1697 that levied heavy penalties, both financial and physical, on those brokering without a licence. It set a fixed number of brokers, at 100, but this was later increased as the size of the trade grew.

This limit led to several problems, one of which was that traders began leaving the Royal Exchange, either by their own decision or through expulsion, and started dealing in the streets of London. The street in which they were now dealing was known as 'Exchange Alley', or 'Change Alley'; it was suitably placed close to the Bank of England. Parliament tried to regulate this and ban the unofficial traders from the Change streets.

Traders became weary of "bubbles" when companies rose quickly and fell, so they persuaded Parliament to pass a clause preventing "unchartered" companies from forming.

After the Seven Years' War (1756–1763), trade at Jonathan's Coffee House boomed again. In 1773, Jonathan, together with 150 other brokers, formed a club and opened a new and more formal "Stock Exchange" in Sweeting's Alley. This now had a set entrance fee, by which traders could enter the stock room and trade securities. It was not an exclusive location for trading, as trading also occurred in the Rotunda of the Bank of England. Fraud was also rife during these times and in order to deter such dealings, it was suggested that users of the stock room pay an increased fee. This was not met well and ultimately, the solution came in the form of annual fees and turning the Exchange into a Subscription room.

The Subscription room created in 1801 was the first regulated exchange in London, but the transformation was not welcomed by all parties. On the first day of trading, non-members had to be expelled by a constable. In spite of the disorder, a new and bigger building was planned at Capel Court.

William Hammond laid the first foundation stone for the new building on 18 May. It was finished on 30 December when "The Stock Exchange" was incised on the entrance.

=== First Rule Book ===
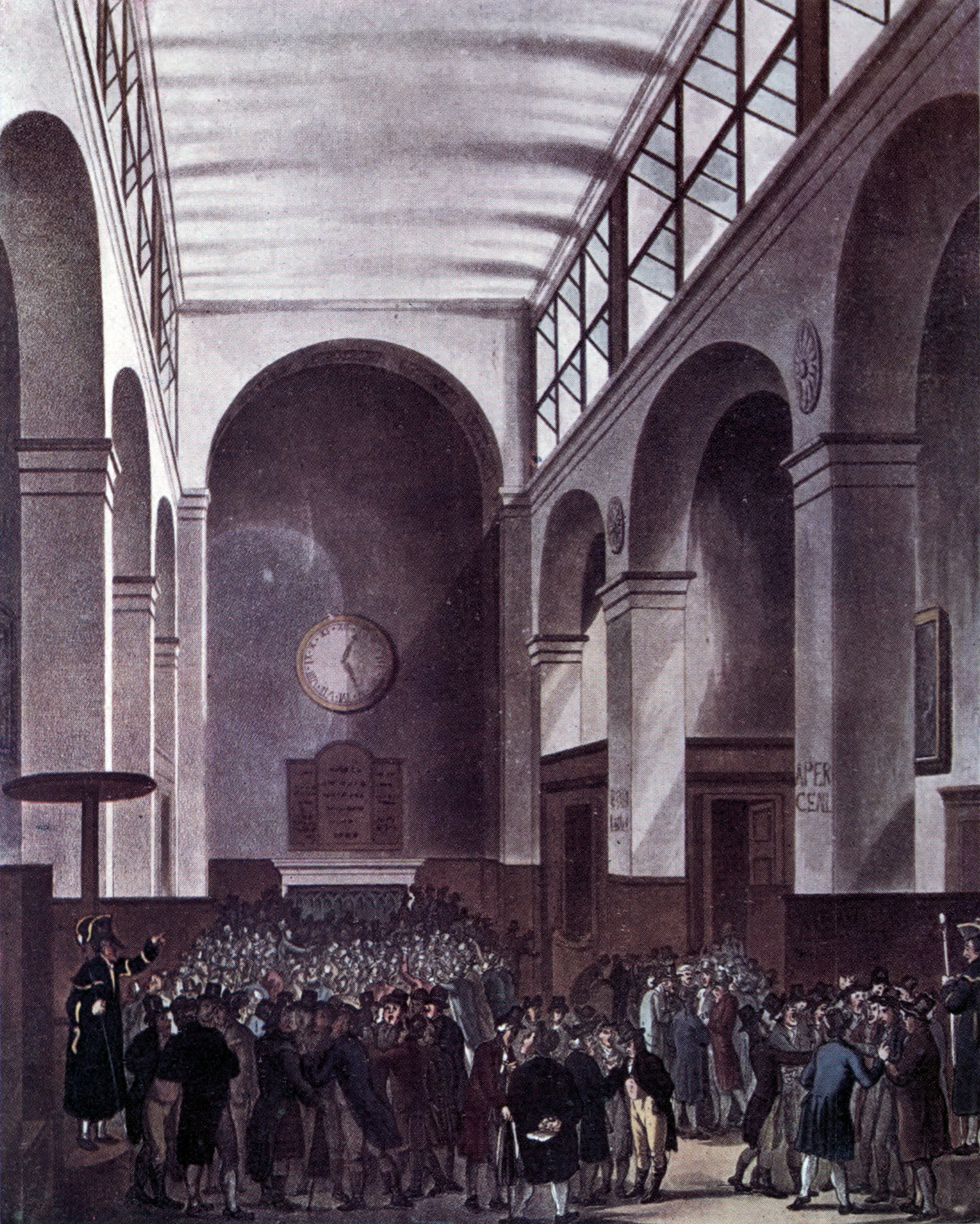
London Stock Exchange in 1810

In the Exchange's first operating years, on several occasions there was no clear set of regulations or fundamental laws for the Capel Court trading. In February 1812, the General Purpose Committee confirmed a set of recommendations, which later became the foundation of the first codified rule book of the Exchange. Even though the document was not a complex one, topics such as settlement and default were, in fact, quite comprehensive.

With its new governmental commandments and increasing trading volume, the Exchange was progressively becoming an accepted part of the financial life in the city. In spite of continuous criticism from newspapers and the public, the government used the Exchange's organised market (and would most likely not have managed without it) to raise the enormous amount of money required for the wars against Napoleon.

=== Foreign and regional exchanges ===
After the war and facing a booming world economy, foreign lending to countries such as Brazil, Peru and Chile was a growing market. Notably, the Foreign Market at the Exchange allowed for merchants and traders to participate, and the Royal Exchange hosted all transactions where foreign parties were involved. The constant increase in overseas business eventually meant that dealing in foreign securities had to be allowed within all of the Exchange's premises.

Just as London enjoyed growth through international trade, the rest of Great Britain also benefited from the economic boom. Two other cities in particular showed great business development: Liverpool and Manchester. In 1836, both the Manchester and Liverpool stock exchanges were opened. Some stock prices sometimes rose by 10%, 20% or even 30% in a week. These were times when stockbroking was considered a real business profession, and such attracted many entrepreneurs. With booms came busts, and in 1835 the "Spanish panic" hit the markets, followed by a second one two years later.

=== The Exchange before the World Wars ===
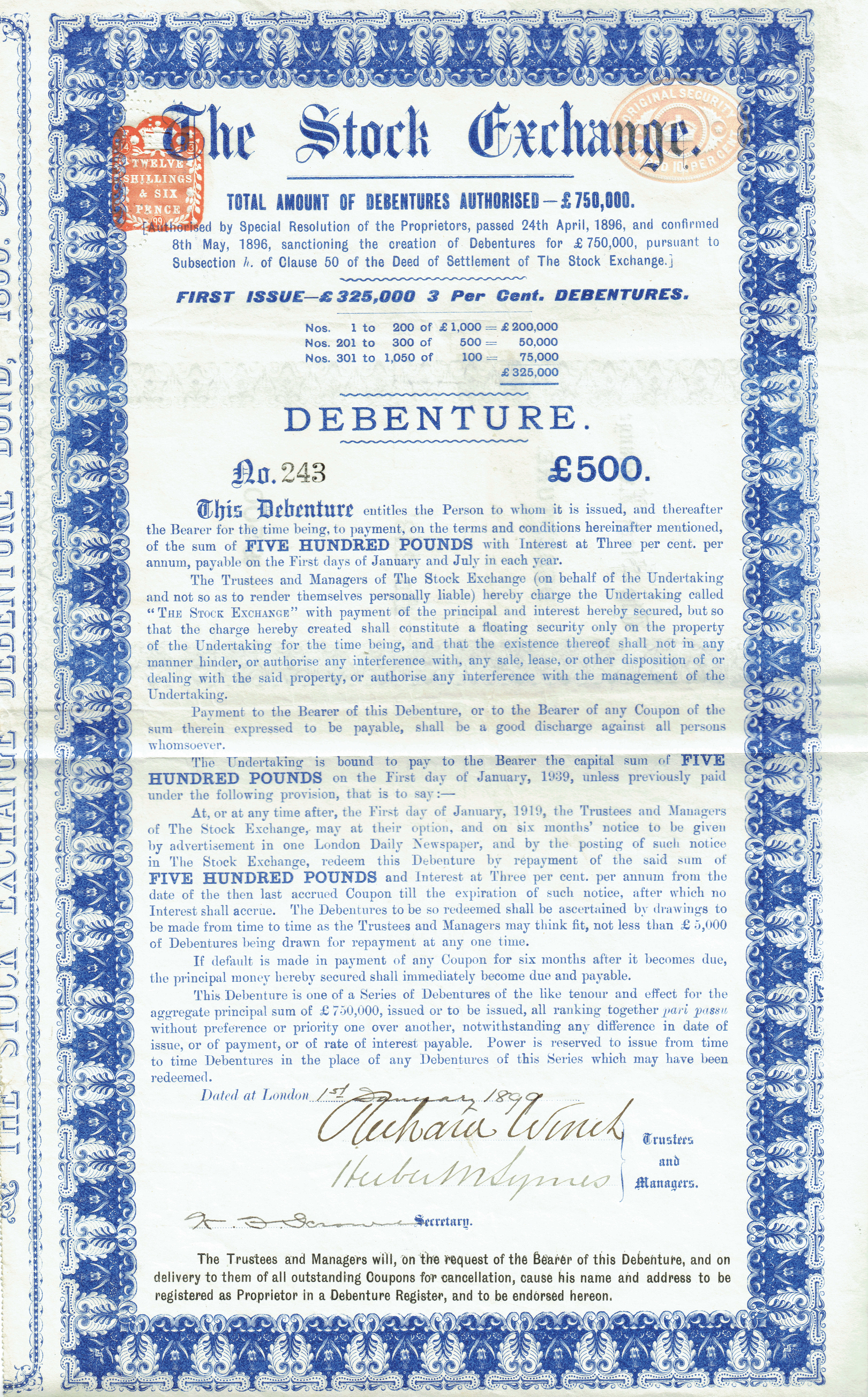
Debenture of The Stock Exchange, issued 1 January 1899

By June 1853, both participating members and brokers were taking up so much space that the Exchange was now uncomfortably crowded, and continual expansion plans were taking place. Having already been extended west, east, and northwards, it was decided that the Exchange needed an entire new establishment. Thomas Allason was appointed as the main architect. In March 1854, the new brick building inspired by the Great Exhibition stood ready. This was a huge improvement in both surroundings and space, with twice the floor space available.

By the late 1800s, the telephone, ticker tape, and the telegraph had been invented. Those new technologies led to a revolution in the work of the Exchange.

=== First World War ===
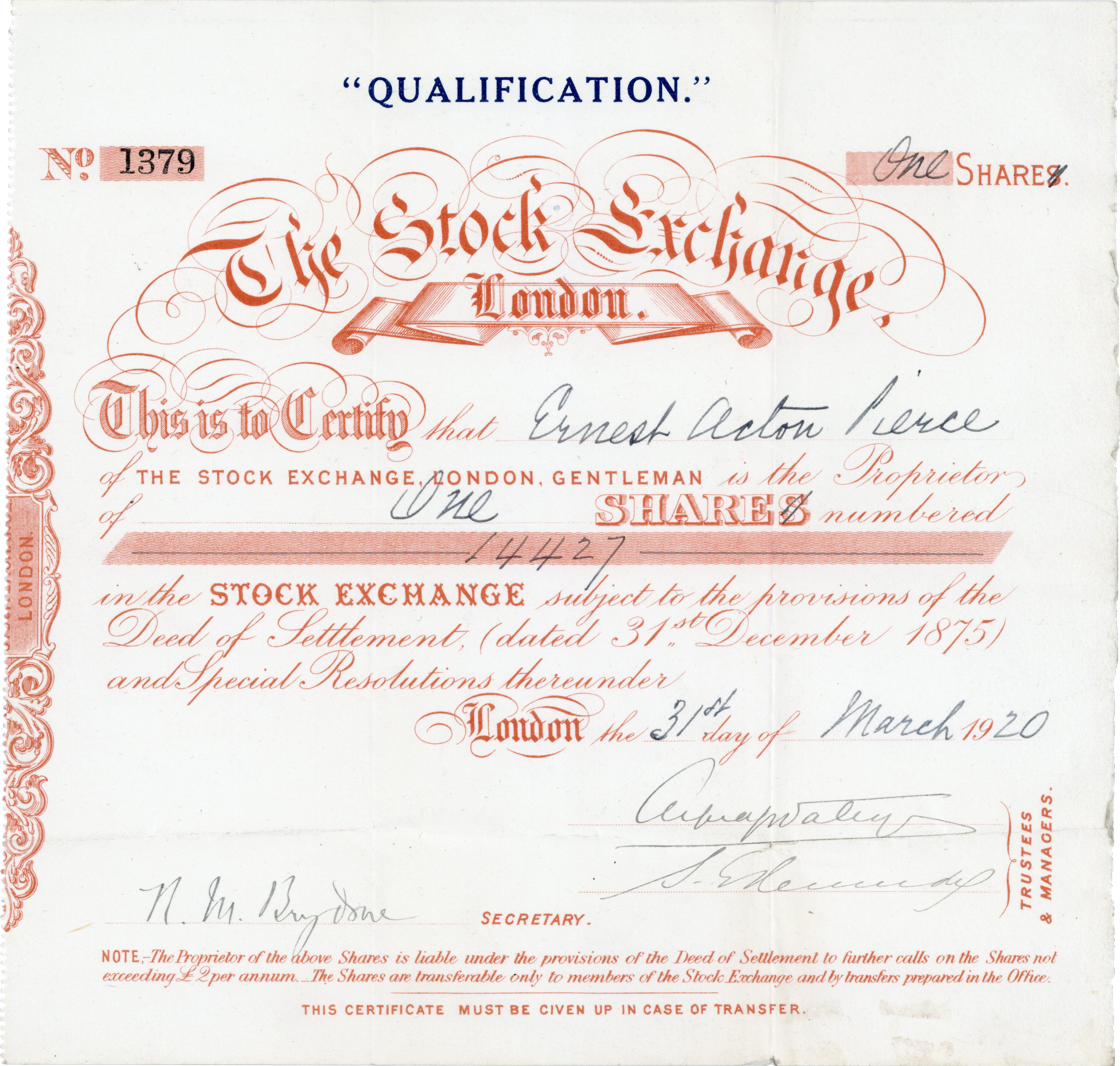
Stock certificate of the London Stock Exchange, issued on 31 March 1920, declared as a qualification share. The capital of the Exchange from its incorporation consisted of 20,000 shares held only by its members, with trustees and directors required to hold 10 qualification shares.

As the financial centre of the world, both the City and the Stock Exchange were hit hard by the outbreak of World War I in 1914. Prices surged at first, due to fears that borrowed money was to be called in and that foreign banks would demand their loans or raise interest. The decision to close the Exchange for improved breathing space and to extend the August Bank Holiday to prohibit a run on banks, was hurried through by the committee and Parliament, respectively. The Stock Exchange ended up being closed from the end of July until the New Year, causing street business to be introduced again, as well as the "challenge system".

The Exchange was set to open again on 4 January 1915 under tedious restrictions: transactions were to be in cash only. Due to the limitations and challenges on trading brought by the war, almost a thousand members quit the Exchange between 1914 and 1918. When peace returned in November 1918, the mood on the trading floor was generally cowed. In 1923, the Exchange received its own coat of arms, with the motto Dictum Meum Pactum, My Word is My Bond.

=== Second World War ===
In 1937, officials at the Exchange used their experiences from World War I to draw up plans for how to handle a new war. The main concerns included air raids and the bombing of the Exchange's perimeters. One suggestion was a move to Denham, Buckinghamshire. This never took place. On the first day of September 1939, the Exchange closed its doors "until further notice" and two days later World War II was declared. The Exchange opened its doors again six days later, on 7 September.

As the war escalated into its second year, the concerns for air raids were greater than ever. On the night of 29 December 1940, one of the greatest fires in London's history took place. The Exchange's floor was hit by a clutch of incendiary bombs, which were extinguished quickly. Trading on the floor was now drastically low and most was done over the phone to reduce the possibility of injuries.

The Exchange was only closed for one more day during wartime, in 1945 due to damage from a V-2 rocket. Trading continued in the house's basement.

=== Post-war ===
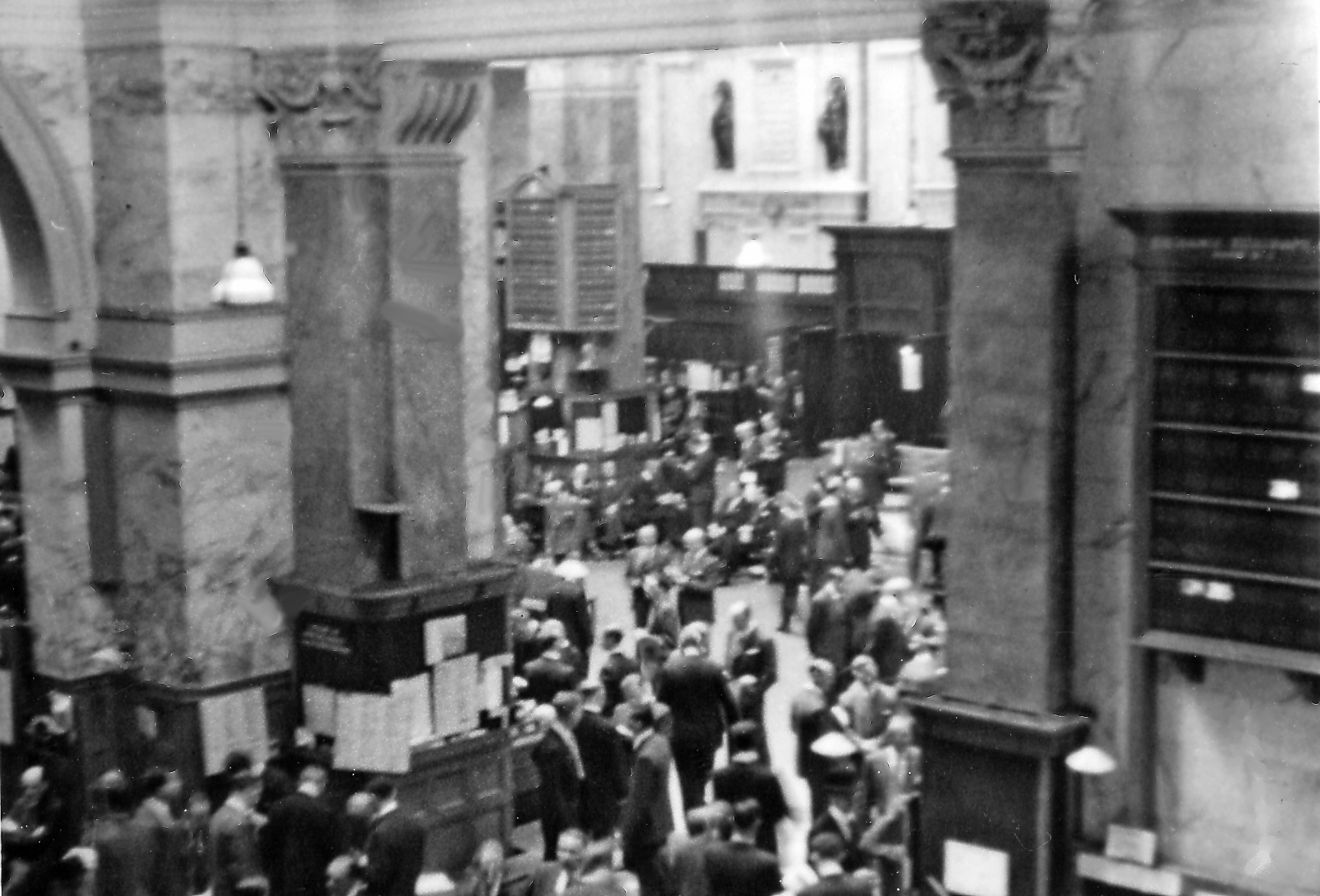
The trading floor in 1955

After decades of uncertain if not turbulent times, stock market business boomed in the late 1950s. This spurred multiple officials to find new, more suitable accommodation. In 1967, work on the new Stock Exchange Tower began. The Exchange's new 321 feet (98 metres) high building had 26 storeys with council and administration at the top, and middle floors let out to affiliate companies. Queen Elizabeth II opened the building on 8 November 1972. It was a new City landmark, with its 23,000 sq ft (2,100 m^{2}) trading floor.

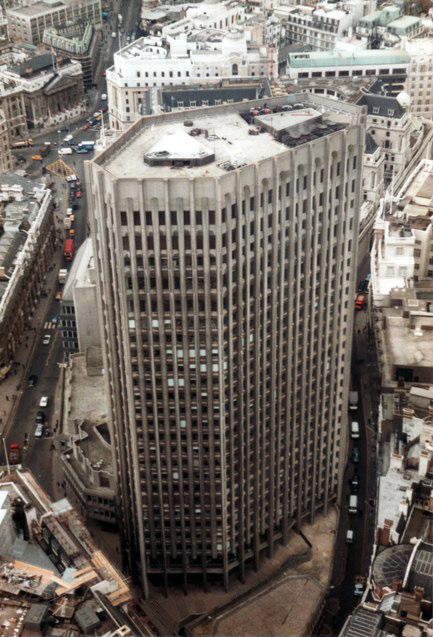
The Stock Exchange Tower pictured from atop the National Westminster Tower in 1983

1973 marked a year of changes for the Stock Exchange. First, two trading prohibitions were abolished. A report from the Monopolies and Mergers Commission recommended the admittance of both women and foreign-born members on the floor. Second, in March the London Stock Exchange formally merged with the eleven British and Irish regional exchanges, including the Scottish Stock Exchange.

This expansion led to the creation of a new position of chief executive officer; after an extensive search this post was given to Robert Fell. There were more governance changes in 1991, when the governing Council of the Exchange was replaced by a board of directors drawn from the Exchange's executive, customer, and user base; and the trading name became "The London Stock Exchange".

The FTSE 100 Index (pronounced "Footsie 100") was launched by a partnership of the Financial Times and the Stock Exchange on 3 January 1984. This turned out to be one of the most useful indices of all, and tracked the movements of the 100 leading companies listed on the Exchange.

=== IRA bombing ===
On 20 July 1990, a bomb planted by the Provisional Irish Republican Army (IRA) exploded in the men's toilets behind the visitors' gallery. The area had already been evacuated and nobody was injured. About 30 minutes before the blast at 8:49 a.m., a man who said he was a member of the IRA told Reuters that a bomb had been placed at the exchange and was about to explode. Police officials said that if there had been no warning, the human toll would have been very high. The explosion ripped a hole in the 23-storey building in Threadneedle Street and sent a shower of glass and concrete onto the street. The long-term trend towards electronic trading platforms reduced the Exchange's attraction to visitors, and although the gallery reopened, it was closed permanently in 1992.

=== "Big Bang" ===
The biggest event of the 1980s was the sudden de-regulation of the financial markets in the UK in 1986. The phrase "Big Bang" was coined to describe measures, including abolition of fixed commission charges and of the distinction between stockjobbers and stockbrokers on the London Stock Exchange, as well as the change from an open outcry to electronic, screen-based trading.

In 1995, the Exchange launched the Alternative Investment Market, the AIM, to allow growing companies to expand into international markets. Two years later, the Electronic Trading Service (SETS) was launched, bringing greater speed and efficiency to the market. Next, the CREST settlement service was launched.

=== 21st century ===
In 2000, the LSE's shareholders voted to become a public limited company, London Stock Exchange plc. The LSE also transferred its role as the United Kingdom's listing authority to the Financial Services Authority.

EDX London, an international equity derivatives business, was created in 2003 in partnership with OM Group. The Exchange also acquired Proquote Limited, a new generation supplier of real-time market data and trading systems.

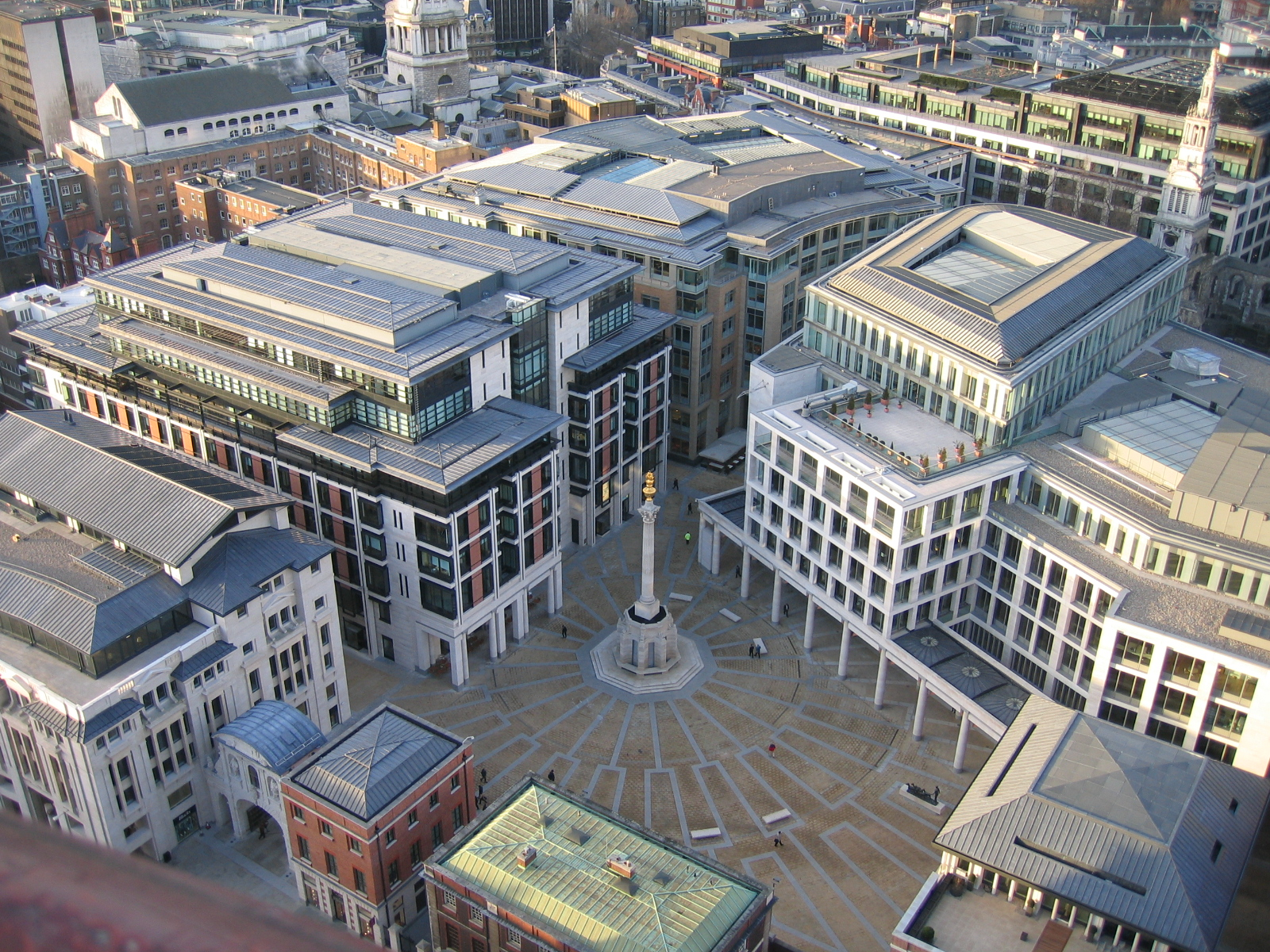
Paternoster Square; LSEG occupies the building that takes up much of the right side of this picture.

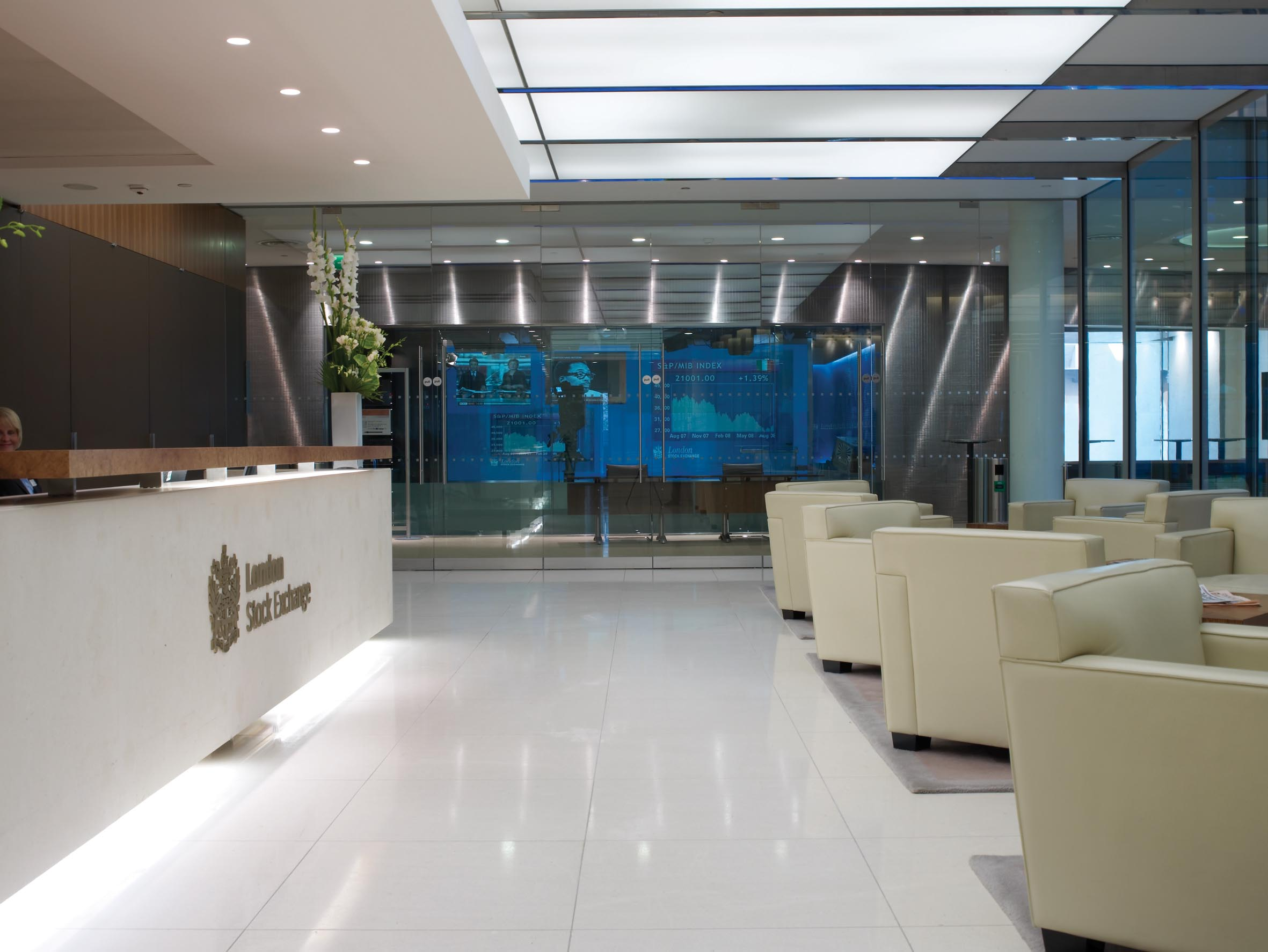
London Stock Exchange office interior at Paternoster Square

The old Stock Exchange Tower became largely redundant with Big Bang, which deregulated many of the LSE's activities: computerised systems and dealing rooms replaced face-to-face trading. In 2004, the LSE moved to a brand-new headquarters in Paternoster Square, close to St Paul's Cathedral.

In 2007, the LSE merged with Borsa Italiana, creating London Stock Exchange Group (LSEG). The Group's headquarters are in Paternoster Square.

Paternoster Square was the initial target for the protesters of Occupy London on 15 October 2011. Attempts to occupy the square were thwarted by police. Police sealed off the entrance to the square as it is private property, a High Court injunction having previously been granted against public access to the square. The protesters moved nearby to occupy the space in front of St Paul's Cathedral. The protests were part of the global Occupy movement.

On 25 April 2019, the final day of the Extinction Rebellion disruption in London, 13 activists glued themselves together in a chain, blocking the entrances of the LSE. The protesters were all later arrested on suspicion of aggravated trespass. Extinction Rebellion had said its protesters would target the financial industry "and the corrosive impacts of the ... sector on the world we live in" and activists also blocked entrances to HM Treasury and the Goldman Sachs office on Fleet Street.

In 2019, the London Stock Exchange introduced the Green Economy Mark, a designation awarded to companies that derive at least 50% of their revenues from environmental or sustainable products and services, with more than 80 issuers receiving the mark by mid-2020.

According to a 2020 Financial Conduct Authority report, approximately 15% of British adults reported having investments in stocks and shares.

On 3 March 2022 the LSE declared it would suspend trading in GDR securities for Russian firms, subsequent to the 2022 Russian invasion of Ukraine.

== Activities ==
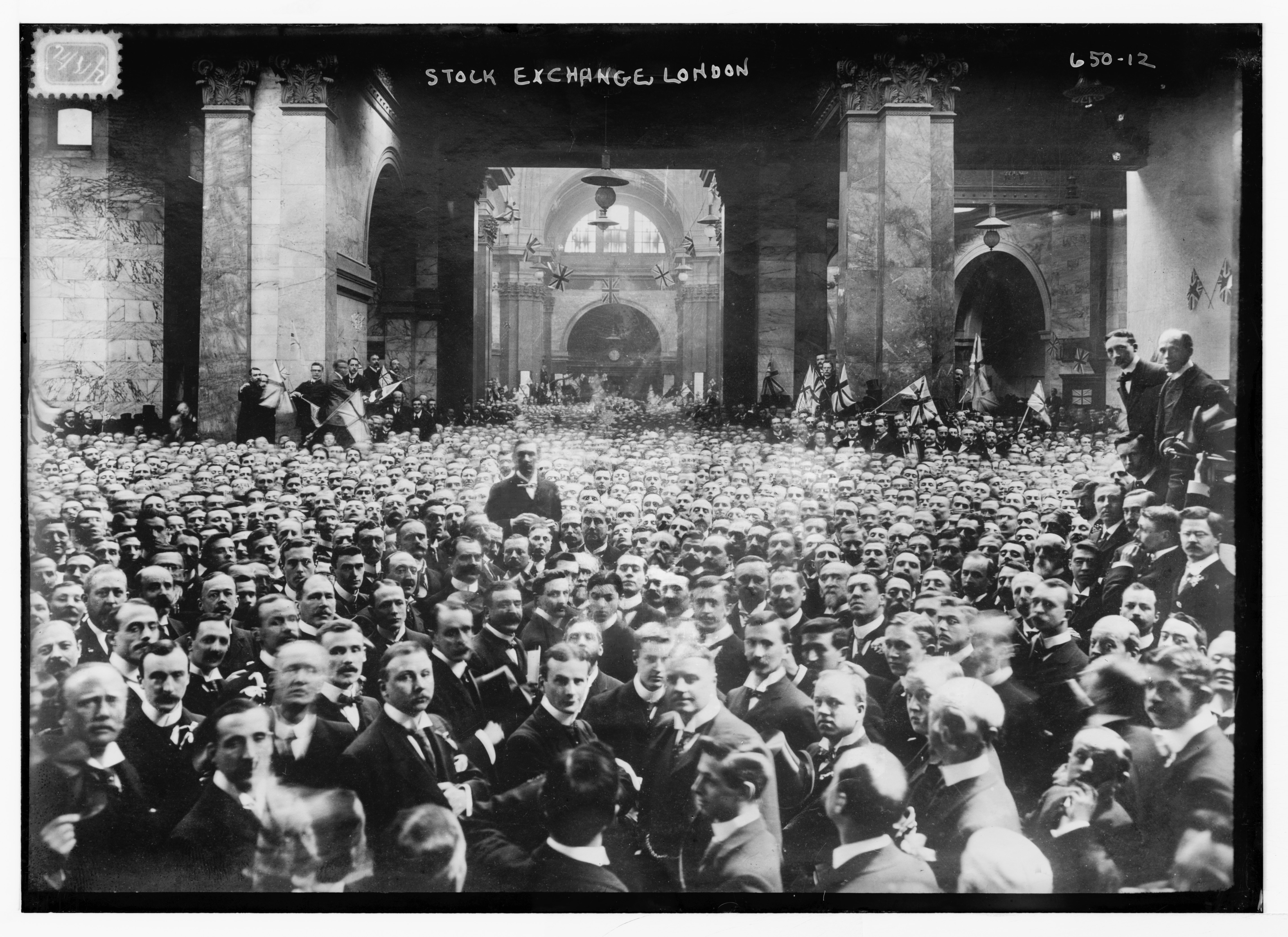
A crowd on the stock exchange floor, London, between 1910 and 1920

=== Primary markets ===
There are two main markets on which companies trade on the LSE: the main market and the alternative investment market.

==== Main Market ====
The main market is home to over 1,300 large companies from 60 countries. The FTSE 100 Index ("footsie") is the main share index of the 100 most highly capitalised British companies listed on the Main Market.

==== Alternative Investment Market ====
The Alternative Investment Market is LSE's international market for smaller companies. A wide range of businesses including early-stage, venture capital-backed, as well as more-established companies join AIM seeking access to growth capital. The AIM is classified as a Multilateral Trading Facility (MTF) under the 2004 MiFID directive, and as such it is a flexible market with a simpler admission process for companies wanting to be publicly listed.

=== Secondary markets ===
The securities available for trading on LSE:

- Common stock
- Bonds, including retail bonds
- Derivatives
- Exchange-traded funds
- Debt securities
- Exchange-traded commodities
- Structured products
- Covered warrants
- Global depositary receipts (GDRs)
- Gilt-edged securities

== Post trade ==
Through the Exchange's Italian arm, Borsa Italiana, the London Stock Exchange Group offers clearing and settlement services for trades through Cassa di Compensazione e Garanzia (CC&G) and Monte Titoli. It is the Groups Central Counterparty and covers multiple asset classes throughout the Italian equity, derivatives and bond markets.

CC&G also clears Turquoise derivatives. Monte Titoli is the pre-settlement, settlement, custody and asset services provider of the Group. Monte Titoli operates both on-exchange and OTC trades with over 400 banks and brokers.

== Technology ==
The LSE's trading platform is its own Linux-based edition named Millennium Exchange.

Their previous trading platform TradElect was based on Microsoft's .NET Framework, and was developed by Microsoft and Accenture.

In 2009, despite TradElect only being in use for about two years, after suffering multiple periods of extended downtime and unreliability the LSE announced that it was planning to switch to Linux in 2010. In February 2011, the main market migration to MillenniumIT technology was successfully completed.

In October 1997, the previous system, SETS, was introduced and used until 2007.

The London Market Information Link, a COBOL application running on a HP Tandem server, was used to disseminate market data to terminals before being replaced by Infolect.

The LSE facilitates stock listings in a currency other than its "home currency". Most stocks are quoted in GBP but some are quoted in EUR while others are quoted in USD.

The LSE hosts numerous Israeli tech companies, which, according to the UK-Israel Tech Hub, have been instrumental in boosting its growth and fostering bilateral economic ties. LSE CEO Julia Hoggett has commended the Israeli tech sector, highlighting the importance of high tech companies trading on the LSE.

== Mergers and acquisitions ==
On 3 May 2000, it was announced that the LSE would merge with the Deutsche Börse; however this fell through.

On 23 June 2007, the LSE announced that it had agreed on the terms of a recommended offer to the shareholders of the Borsa Italiana S.p.A. The merger of the two companies created a leading diversified exchange group in Europe. The combined group was named the London Stock Exchange Group, but still remained two separate legal and regulatory entities. One of the long-term strategies of the joint company is to expand Borsa Italiana's efficient clearing services to other European markets.

In 2007, after Borsa Italiana announced that it was exercising its call option to acquire full control of MBE Holdings; thus the combined Group would now control Mercato dei Titoli di Stato, or MTS. This merger of Borsa Italiana and MTS with LSE's existing bond-listing business enhanced the range of covered European fixed income markets.

In 2009, the London Stock Exchange Group acquired Turquoise, a Pan-European MTF.

On 9 October 2020, the LSE agreed to sell the Borsa Italiana (including Borsa's bond trading platform MTS) to Euronext for €4.3 billion (£3.9 billion) in cash. Euronext completed the acquisition of the Borsa Italiana Group on 29 April 2021, for a final price of €4,444 million.

On 12 December 2022, Microsoft bought a nearly 4% stake in London Stock Exchange Group as part of a ten-year cloud deal.

=== NASDAQ bids ===
In December 2005, the LSE rejected a £1.6 billion takeover offer from Macquarie Bank. It described the offer as "derisory", a sentiment echoed by shareholders in the Exchange. Shortly after Macquarie withdrew its offer, the LSE received an unsolicited approach from NASDAQ valuing the company at £2.4 billion. This too it rejected. NASDAQ later pulled its bid, and less than two weeks later on 11 April 2006, struck a deal with LSE's largest shareholder, Ameriprise Financial's Threadneedle Asset Management unit, to acquire all of that firm's stake, consisting of 35.4 million shares, at £11.75 per share.

NASDAQ purchased 2.69 million additional shares, resulting in a total stake of 15%. While the seller of those shares was undisclosed, it occurred simultaneously with a sale by Scottish Widows of 2.69 million shares. The move was seen as an effort to force LSE to the negotiating table, as well as to limit the Exchange's strategic flexibility.

Subsequent purchases increased NASDAQ's stake to 25.1%, holding off competing bids for several months. United Kingdom financial rules required that NASDAQ wait for a period of time before renewing its effort. On 20 November 2006, within a month or two of the expiration of this period, NASDAQ increased its stake to 28.75% and launched a hostile offer at the minimum permitted bid of £12.43 per share, which was the highest NASDAQ had paid on the open market for its existing shares. The LSE immediately rejected this bid, stating that it "substantially undervalues" the company.

NASDAQ revised its offer, characterised as an "unsolicited" bid, rather than a "hostile takeover attempt", on 12 December 2006, indicating that it would be able to complete the deal with 50%, plus one share, of LSE's stock, rather than the 90% it had been seeking. The U.S. exchange did not raise its bid. Many hedge funds had accumulated large positions within the LSE, and many managers of those funds, as well as Furse, indicated that the bid was still not satisfactory. NASDAQ's bid was made more difficult because it had described its offer as "final", which, under British bidding rules, restricted their ability to raise its offer except under certain circumstances.

In the end, NASDAQ's offer was roundly rejected by LSE shareholders. Having received acceptances of only 0.41% of rest of the register by the deadline on 10 February 2007, Nasdaq's offer duly lapsed.

On 20 August 2007, NASDAQ announced that it was abandoning its plan to take over the LSE and subsequently look for options to divest its 31% (61.3 million shares) shareholding in the company in light of its failed takeover attempt. In September 2007, NASDAQ agreed to sell the majority of its shares to Borse Dubai, leaving the United Arab Emirates-based exchange with 28% of the LSE.

=== Proposed merger with TMX Group ===
On 9 February 2011, London Stock Exchange Group announced it had agreed to merge with the Toronto-based TMX Group, the owners of the Toronto Stock Exchange, creating a combined entity with a market capitalisation of listed companies equal to £3.7 trillion. Xavier Rolet, CEO of the LSE Group at the time, would have headed the new enlarged company, while TMX Chief Executive Thomas Kloet would have become the new firm president. On 29 June 2011, the LSE Group however announced it was terminating the merger with TMX, citing that "LSEG and TMX Group believe that the merger is highly unlikely to achieve the required two-thirds majority approval at the TMX Group shareholder meeting". Even though LSEG obtained the necessary support from its shareholders, it failed to obtain the required support from TMX's shareholders.

== Opening times ==
Normal trading sessions on the main orderbook (SETS) are from 08:00 to 16:30 local time every day of the week except Saturdays, Sundays and holidays declared by the exchange in advance. The detailed schedule is as follows:

1. Trade reporting 07:15–07:50
2. Opening auction 07:50–08:00
3. Continuous trading 08:00–16:30
4. Closing auction 16:30–16:35
5. Order maintenance 16:35–17:00
6. Trade reporting only 17:00–17:15

In July 2026, the London Stock Exchange announced plans to launch LSE 24, a separate night-time exchange, in the first half of 2027. It was initially expected to offer exchange-traded products tracking British and American markets and operate from 5:00 p.m. to 7:50 a.m. London time, with a 30-minute pause for end-of-day processing.

=== Auction periods (SETQx) ===
SETSqx (Stock Exchange Electronic Trading Service – quotes and crosses) is a trading service for securities less liquid than those traded on SETS.

The auction uncrossings are scheduled to take place at 8:00, 9:00, 11:00, 14:00, and 16:35.

Observed holidays are New Year's Day, Good Friday, Easter Monday, May Bank Holiday, Spring Bank Holiday, Summer Bank Holiday, Christmas Day, and Boxing Day. If New Year's Day, Christmas Day, and/or Boxing Day falls on a weekend, the following working day is observed as a holiday.

== Arms ==
Coat of arms of London Stock Exchange
Adopted 10 September 1923 Crest On a wreath of the colours, In front of a tower proper a lion passant guardant Or. Escutcheon Argent, a cross and in the first quarter a sword erect gules; on a chief of the second a balance Or. Supporters On either side a griffin sable, gorged with a mural crown Or. Motto DICTUM MEUM PACTUM.

== See also ==
- List of stock exchanges
- List of stock exchanges in the Commonwealth of Nations
- List of stock exchanges in the United Kingdom, the British Crown Dependencies and United Kingdom Overseas Territories
- Stock Exchange forgery 1872–73
- TAURUS (share settlement)
