= Verseon =

Pharmaceutical company

Verseon International Corporation
- Industry: Pharmaceutical
- Founded: 2002
- Founders: Adityo Prakash, Eniko Fodor, David Kita
- Headquarters: Fremont, California, United States
- Website: https://www.verseon.com/

Verseon International Corporation is a clinical-stage pharmaceutical company based in Fremont, California. It is developing several drug discovery programs in cardiometabolic diseases and cancer featuring drug candidates that represent novel chemical matter designed using molecular physics and artificial intelligence.

== History ==
Verseon was founded in 2002 by Adityo Prakash, Eniko Fodor, and David Kita, who created the company's proprietary physics-based computational drug discovery platform.

Through two early rounds of private funding, Verseon raised $34.5 million from high-profile investors including John Leonard, President and Chief Executive Officer of Intellia Therapeutics and former Chief Scientific Officer of AbbVie Inc and Robert Karr former Senior Vice President of R&D Strategy at Pfizer.

In 2015, Verseon completed a $100.5 million (£68.5 million) stock exchange listing on the London Alternative Investment Market (AIM), with backing from several major UK investors. In December 2019, after obtaining stockholder approval, Verseon returned to private ownership.

Prominent members of Verseon's scientific advisory board include Steven Chu, Nobel Prize-winning physicist and former US energy secretary and Frank Doyle dean of the Harvard John A. Paulson School of Engineering and Applied Sciences.

== Drug discovery platform ==
Verseon's drug discovery platform generates virtual, novel, synthesizable drug-like compounds, models their interactions with proteins of interest to identify promising drug candidates, and then advances those candidates through synthesis and testing. The candidates are further optimized using AI to yield clinical candidates with requisite characteristics. This kind of physics-based molecular modeling platform could be a new way for the pharmaceutical industry to discover drugs. Nano Magazine noted the platform has produced “multiple chemically diverse clinical candidates…unlikely to be found through any other method” for every one of its drug programs. Currently, most drugs are discovered using the high-throughput screening method.

== Drug pipeline ==
As of November 2021, Verseon's pipeline includes 14 drugs in 7 programs in the areas of cardiovascular disease, diabetes, cancer, and liver disease.

The company's first cardiovascular disease (CVD) drug candidate is nearing completion of Phase 1 clinical trials. The stated goal of the CVD program is to produce anticoagulants safe for long-term use without the heightened risk of uncontrolled bleeding posed by other anticoagulant drugs. Preclinical tests have found that Verseon's novel anticoagulant compounds prevent thrombosis while preserving platelet function, meaning they are associated with significantly lower bleeding times than other currently approved anticoagulants dabigatran, argatroban or apixaban.

In August 2021 the company announced that its oral prophylactic treatments for vision loss related to diabetic retinopathy, a condition affecting roughly one third of all diabetics, are close to starting Phase 1 clinical trials. This program explores viable alternatives to regular injections into the eyes of diabetic patients.

Its three oncology programs focus on novel chemotherapy agents for multidrug-resistant cancers, cancers that express CD73 (a cell-surface protein that locally suppresses immune response to tumors), and treatments for aggressive metastatic cancers.

Verseon is also conducting a program for the treatment of hereditary angioedema, a rare genetic disorder characterized by recurrent episodes of severe swelling in areas such as the limbs, face, intestinal tract, or airways.
