= Turquoise (trading platform) =

- Type: Multilateral trading facility
- Location: London, United Kingdom
- Founded: 2008
- Owner: London Stock Exchange Group
- Website: http://www.tradeturquoise.com/

Turquoise is an equities trading platform (multilateral trading facility or MTF), created by nine major investment banks in 2008. The aim was to provide dealing services at a 50% discount to traditional exchanges. It is a hybrid system that allows trading both on and off traditional exchanges. The system was advertised as a "pan-European platform based in London".

== History ==
It was set up by a consortium of banks made up of BNP Paribas, Citi, Credit Suisse, Deutsche Bank, Goldman Sachs, Merrill Lynch, Morgan Stanley, Société Générale and UBS. The group selected EuroCCP to provide clearing and settlement services. The group selected Sweden's Cinnober as its trading platform. Turquoise developed a real-time market surveillance system "to capture breaches of trading rules and root out market irregularities". The system is based on the Software AG Apama complex event processing platform. Turquoise was successfully launched in August 2008. Turquoise uses QuantHouse as low latency market data feed for its platform.

In December 2009, the London Stock Exchange Group agreed to take a 60% stake in trading platform Turquoise, which had a 7% share of the market. Turquoise was merged with the LSE's trading facility Baikal Global.

On October 4, 2010, Turquoise migrated to MillenniumIT platform. The next day internal technical problems discovered overnight forced the exchange to postpone the system's opening until 9:15am. The system was out of service for two hours in November 2010. The London Stock Exchange said "preliminary investigations indicate that this human error may have occurred in suspicious circumstances".

Turquoise has expanded to include the trading of Option and Future Derivatives with its new Electronic Sola Trading derivatives platform launched in June 2011, started with the addition of FTSE Index 100 Futures contracts and has expanded to have FTSE 100 Options contracts in September 2011. This exchange has been recognized as the award winner of the "Best New Derivatives Trading Platform/Service" by the Financial News Awards for Excellence in Trading and Technology, Europe 2011. Since September 2013, Turquoise Derivatives business was acquired by London Stock Exchange plc.

In October 2014, Turquoise launched block discovery service to enable participants trading large orders by matching block indications. The service won 'Most innovative trading service' at Trading&Technology awards 2015.

In May 2016, Turquoise announced plans to extend dark pool to the Czech Republic, Poland, Hungary.

In April 2021, Turquoise announced it volumes surged in the first three months following Brexit.

In September 2021, Turquoise announced it crossed the €1 trillion milestone in equities trading since its partnership with Plato. It also expanded access to US share trading during UK market hours via a new business unit and announced it had become the first trading venue to connect to OpenFin so that its data feed could be delivered to FlexTrade.

In August 2022, Turquoise partnered with financial services firm M-DAQ to provide market participants with the ability to trade cross-currency securities and settle in their currency of choice.

In September 2022, Turquoise announced the reintroduction of trading tariffs in an effort to boost its lit markets business. They were removed in 2018 because market participants said they harmed best execution.

== See also ==
- Chi-X Europe
- Euronext
- NYSE Euronext
- London International Financial Futures and Options Exchange
