= Donald Brydon =

British businessman (born 1945)

Sir Donald Brydon CBE
- Born: 25 May 1945 (age 81); Stirling, Scotland
- Education: University of Edinburgh
- Occupation: Businessman

Sir Donald Hood Brydon CBE (born 1945) is a British businessman who is chairman of the Sage Group and of the Charities Chance to Shine and The Science Museum Foundation.

He was previously chairman of London Stock Exchange Group, Royal Mail, Smiths Group, the London Metal Exchange, Amersham plc, Taylor Nelson Sofres, ifs School of Finance, the Medical Research Council and EveryChild and a Director of Allied Domecq and Scottish Power.

== Biography ==
Brydon attended George Watson's College, before studying at the University of Edinburgh and graduating in Mathematical Science in 1967. During this time he was chairman of the University's Conservative Association alongside his fellow Watsonian Malcolm Rifkind, who was secretary. He was also elected President of Edinburgh University Union. Brydon remained in Edinburgh to teach at the University for three years after graduation.

In 1977 Brydon began a 20-year career working at Barclays, during which time he became chairman and chief executive of the company's investment arm, BZW Investment Management.

From 1997 to 2002 Brydon was chief executive officer at Axa Investment Managers.

In 2004 Brydon was awarded a CBE for services to the financial industry.

As chairman of the Royal Mail, whilst in office for a period of six years Brydon oversaw the controversial privatisation of the 499-year-old institution.

He resigned from the Royal Mail Group in 2015 and became chairman of the London Stock Exchange Group.

Brydon was appointed a Knight Bachelor in the 2019 New Year Honours for services to Business and charity.
