= Solh =

Al-Solh (or variants as-Solh, Solh, el-Solh) (Arabic: الصلح) is an Arabic surname, mostly from Lebanon.

Notable people with the name Solh and its variants include:

- Riad Al Solh (1894–1951), Lebanese politician, former Prime Minister, the first prime minister of Lebanon after the country's independence
- Sami as-Solh (1887–1968), Lebanese politician, former Prime Minister
- Takieddin el-Solh (1908–1988), Lebanese politician, former Prime Minister
- Rachid Solh (1926–2014), Lebanese politician, former Prime Minister
- Leila Al Solh (born 1946), vice president of Alwaleed bin Talal Humanitarian Foundation and a former Lebanese minister of industry
- Kazem El-Solh (1904–1976), Lebanese politician, a diplomat
- Mounira Solh (1911–2010), Lebanese pioneer advocate for the rights of women and people with disabilities
- Sana Solh (1939–2019), Lebanese human rights activist
- Waheed el Solh (1901–1958), Lebanese politician.
- Raghid El-Solh (1942–2017), Lebanese writer and researcher
- Mahmoud Solh, Lebanese agricultural economist and genetic scientist
- Karim El Solh, Lebanese businessman, founder and CEO of private equity firm Gulf Capital.

== See also ==
- Sulh, also solh, Arabic word which means peace as opposed to war. It is derived from the same root as Arabic word musalaha meaning reconciliation.[1] In Islamic Law it means an amicable settlement.
- Solh Kabul F.C., football team in Afghanistan
