= List of Lebanese people in the United Kingdom =

This is a list of notable British people with Lebanese ancestry or Lebanese people who have dual Lebanese and British nationality who live or lived in the United Kingdom.

== Actors ==
- Omar Baroud - actor of Curaçao-Lebanese heritage
- Nadim Naaman - actor, singer, playwright, composer
- Taz Skylar - actor and writer
- Samia Smith - actress
- Sean Yazbeck - winner of the fifth season (2006) of Donald Trump's reality show, The Apprentice

== Athletes ==
- Sandy Abi-Elias - footballer
- Jed Chouman - footballer
- Cyrus Christie - footballer
- Hady Ghandour - footballer
- Tarek Haffar - rugby union player
- Majed Osman - footballer

== Businesspeople ==
- Assaad Razzouk - CEO of Gurīn, clean-energy entrepreneur, author, podcaster, commentator, married to British-Lebanese journalist Roula Khalaf
- Marlon Abela - columnist, businessman, restaurateur, and the founder and chairman of the Marlon Abela Restaurant Corporation (MARC), a privately owned international hospitality company based in Mayfair, London.
- Samir Assaf - CEO of HSBC investment
- Johnny Boufarhat - businessman
- Samir Brikho - Businessman
- Ely Calil - Businessman
- Camille F Chamoun - Businessman, Life Coach and Founding member of the Lebanese community of Kingston-Upon-Hull.
- Lawrence Haddad, economist, Lebanese parents
- Sam Hammam - owner of Cardiff City F.C.
- Leila Hoteit, businesswoman

== Entertainment ==
- Alex Garland - writer, filmmaker, director and grandson of Peter Medawar
- Big Zuu - rapper, songwriter, presenter, and grime artist of half Lebanese and half Sierra Leonean descent
- Dom Joly - comedian, columnist and broadcaster
- Esther Manito, comedian
- Isabelle Farah, comedian, presenter, actress and writer

== Musicians ==
- Al Bowlly - Dance Band singer
- Bushra El-Turk - composer
- Mika - musician and songwriter
- Sarbel - Lebanese-British-Cypriot singer

== Scientists ==
- Michael Atiyah - British-Lebanese mathematician
- Peter Medawar - British scientist of Lebanese origin, 1960 Nobel Prize winner for work on graft rejection and the discovery of acquired immune tolerance
- Caleb Saleeby - British-Lebanese physician, writer, and journalist known for his support of eugenics. During World War I, he was an adviser to the Minister of Food and advocated the establishment of a Ministry of Health.

== Writers ==
- Roula Khalaf - editor of the Financial Times and married to Assaad Razzouk
- Nasri Atallah - author, publisher, media analyst
- Kiera Azar - novelist and actress
- Nader El-Bizri - philosopher, architectural theorist
- Sabine Getty - socialite and contributor to Tatler
- Saleem Haddad - author
- Albert Hourani - historian
- George Hourani - philosopher and historian
- Michael Karam - journalist, author, wine writer
- Naeem Murr - novelist and short story writer
- Anbara Salam - author

== Other ==
- Amal Clooney (née Alamuddin) - lawyer
- Oliver Cooper - Conservative politician
- Gabriel Coury - recipient of the Victoria Cross, the highest and most prestigious award for gallantry in the face of the enemy that can be awarded to British and Commonwealth forces.
- Anissa Helou - chef, teacher, and author
- Marwan Kaabour - graphic designer, artist and editor
- Lina Khatib - academic
- Philip Khoury - Australian plant-based pastry chef at Harrods
- Nadine Merabi - fashion designer

== See also ==
- Lebanese people in the United Kingdom
- List of Lebanese people
- Lists of Lebanese diaspora
