= 2008 Hamas–Israel ceasefire =

2008 Egyptian-brokered six-month temporary peace in Gaza

Monthly rocket hits in Israel in 2008, according to Israeli military-tied Meir Amit Intelligence and Terrorism Information Center

The 2008 Hamas–Israel ceasefire was an Egyptian-brokered six-month Tahdia (an Arabic term for a lull) "for the Gaza area", which went into effect between Hamas and Israel on 19 June 2008. According to the Egyptian-brokered agreement, Israel promised to stop air strikes and other attacks, while in return, there would not be rocket attacks on Israel from Gaza. Once the ceasefire held, Israel was to gradually begin to ease its blockade of Gaza.

During the initial week of the ceasefire, Islamic Jihad militants fired rockets on Israel. Under pressure from Hamas, Islamic Jihad had agreed to abide by the temporary truce, which was meant to apply only to Gaza, but had balked at the idea of not responding to Israeli military actions in the West Bank. The New York Times reported that the Islamic Jihad action broke the Hamas-Israeli Gaza truce. During the next 5 months of the ceasefire, Gazan attacks decreased significantly for a total of 19 rocket and 18 mortar shell launchings, compared to 1199 rockets and 1072 mortar shells in 2008 up to 19 June, a reduction of 98%.

The agreement called on Israel to increase the level of goods entering Gaza by 30 percent over the pre-lull period within 72 hours and to open all border crossings and "allow the transfer of all goods that were banned and restricted to go into Gaza" within 13 days after the beginning of the ceasefire. The increase in supplies of food, water, medicine and fuel did improve, but the increase was only to an average of about 20 percent of normal levels. Two months later the volume of goods arriving was too low to significantly improved living conditions, preventing UNRWA from replenishing its stores. Israel told U.S. officials in 2008 it would keep Gaza's economy "on the brink of collapse".

On 4 November 2008, Israel raided Gaza, killing six Hamas militants and effectively ending the ceasefire. The Israeli military said the target of the raid was a tunnel that they said Hamas was planning to use to capture Israeli soldiers positioned on the border fence 250m away. Hamas officials said that the tunnel was being dug for defensive purposes. Following the Israeli raid, Hamas launched barrage of rocket fire at targets in southern Israel. On 20 December, Hamas announced it would not renew the ceasefire. Israel commenced Operation Cast Lead, an organized ground and air assault against military and police targets in Hamas-controlled Gaza, on 27 December 2008, sparking the 2008-2009 Gaza conflict.

== Background ==
Number of Mortar & Rocket hits in Israel

After its 2006 Palestinian legislative election victory, Hamas assumed administrative control of Gaza, consolidating its this control after a military conflict with Fatah. Israel and Egypt then partially sealed their border crossings with Gaza, on the grounds that Fatah was no longer providing security. They imposed a blockade on the territory, prohibiting many exports and allowing only enough imported goods to avert a humanitarian or health crisis. After many acts of violence, foreign journalists left the Gaza strip due to the lack of security in the zone.

As a result of the June 2007 tightening of the Israeli embargo on Gaza, Hamas and other Palestinian paramilitias more than doubled the monthly number of Qassam rockets and mortars fired from the Gaza strip into Southern Israel. Israel conducted airstrikes and raids against Hamas and other targets in Gaza during 2007 and 2008. Hamas considers Israel an illegitimate state and Israel views Hamas as a terrorist group that must be dismantled. There is no mutually agreed text or enforcement mechanism in the understanding brokered between the two parties, neither of which recognizes the other, that would facilitate a formal ceasefire or armistice.

After visiting Israel and Palestine in April 2008, former President Jimmy Carter stated that "Palestinian leaders from Gaza were noncommittal on all issues, these leaders claimed that rockets were the only way to respond to their imprisonment and to dramatize their humanitarian plight. The top Hamas leaders in Damascus, however, agreed to consider a cease-fire in Gaza only, provided Israel would not attack Gaza and would permit normal humanitarian supplies to be delivered to Palestinian citizens." Hamas was willing to consider a cease-fire in both Gaza and the Fatah controlled West Bank, but the Israelis were only interested in a Gaza agreement.

At the beginning of the cease-fire, Prime Minister Ehud Olmert stated that "We have no illusions. The calm is fragile and likely to be short-lived." He also said that "Hamas is the address in Gaza, and it carries responsibility for everything that happens in Gaza". Hamas leadership had low expectations as well. Just minutes before the start, Israeli aircraft fired on a Gazan rocket launching squad, killing one militant. Prime Minister Ismail Haniyeh described the proposed period in Arabic as a Tahdia, meaning a temporary moment of calm and not a formal cease-fire.

The Israeli opposition in the Knesset blasted the agreement. Likud Chairman Benjamin Netanyahu said, "This is not a relaxation, it's an Israeli agreement to the rearming of Hamas... What are we getting for this?" In Palestine, Authority President Mahmoud Abbas praised it, and he used the lull to seek reconciliation with Hamas. Ha'aretz has alleged that even at the very beginning of the cease-fire Defense Minister Ehud Barak prepared a comprehensive intelligence-gathering program setting up battle plans against Hamas.

== Ceasefire Terms ==
The United Nations Office for the Coordination of Humanitarian Affairs (OCHA) summarised the key components of the ceasefire as follows:

On 19 June, at 6 am, the ceasefire between Israel and Hamas went into effect. As part of the ceasefire, Palestinian militants agreed to immediately halt their attacks on Israel and Israel agreed to cease its military operations in Gaza. Israel also agreed to ease its blockade of Gaza and to gradually lift its ban on the import of a large number of commodities. The ceasefire is supposed to be in force for six months.

A report by the British House of Commons Library, published on 22 January 2009, provides Hamas' understanding of the terms of the ceasefire:

1. Mutual agreement to cease all military activities by the start of "zero hour" on Thursday 19 June, at 6:00 AM.
2. Duration of ceasefire is six months according to agreement concluded among the national parties under Egyptian auspices.
3. Ceasefire will be implemented under national consensus and under Egyptian auspices.
4. After 72 hours from the start of the ceasefire, the crossing points will be opened to allow 30 per cent more goods to enter the Gaza strip.
5. Ten days after that (i.e. thirteen days after ceasefire begins), all crossings would be open between Gaza and Israel, and Israel will allow the transfer of all goods that were banned or restricted to go into Gaza.
6. Egypt will work to expand the ceasefire into the West Bank later.

The agreement also provided for "movement toward the release of Corporal Shalit". On the day of the agreement the BBC referred to the Shalit issue as "negotiations on the return of captured Israeli soldier Gilad Shalit were expected to resume within a few days". Instead, Shalit's release would be dependent on Israel agreeing to a prisoner swap, and be discussed separately from the truce, as Hamas wanted. Shalit's father and grandfather attacked the Israeli government for leaving the soldier out of the cease-fire agreement.

== Ceasefire progress ==
According to The New York Times, neither side fully respected the terms of the cease-fire. Hamas undertook to stop other groups from firing rockets at Israel. It took some days, but it was largely successful, with Hamas imposing its will and even imprisoning some of those who were firing rockets. Nonetheless, some rockets still continued to be fired from Gaza. On the other hand, the Israeli blockade of Gaza was loosened, but the goods shipments, while up some 25 to 30 percent and including a mix of more items, never began to approach the pre-blockade levels. Hamas hoped that the accord would lead Israel to suspend attacks on the West Bank and Gaza. Israeli forces continued to attack Hamas and other militants in the West Bank, prompting the rogue Palestinian militants in Gaza to fire rockets. The Israeli military also found several dozen improvised explosive devices and sniper fire cases on the Gaza border. Israel in turn hoped that the accord would lead to progress on negotiations for the release of Gilad Shalit; neither hope was met. USA Today stated on 1 July that it was not clear how Hamas would know definitively whether a rocket was fired. Several militant factions operate inside Gaza. But Israel had taken a zero tolerance policy towards the truce in which every rocket and/or mortar attack would be punished in some way. On 11 August 2008 Israeli Defense Minister Ehud Barak said that a military invasion of the Gaza Strip would not stop cross-border rocket attacks by Palestinian militants, but that the seven-week-old truce mediated by Egypt had halted the barrages for the first time in years. He said the numbers of short-range unguided rockets hitting Israel from Gaza had been reduced from hundreds to a handful. The same day a senior Hamas official said that the Islamic organization was not interested in renewing talks to free the abducted Israeli soldier Gilad Shalit until Israel completely lifted the siege on Gaza.

=== Israeli violations of the ceasefire prior to 4 November 2008 ===
Palestinian Center for Human Rights recorded several IDF violations in the early days of the lull.

On 19 June 2008, just a few hours after the beginning of the ceasefire Israeli forces opened fire against fishermen and farmers in Gaza.

On 23 June, Israeli forces opened fire against children and farmers in northern Gaza Strip, wounding one of the farmers, Jameel 'Abdul Rahman al-Ghoul, 68, in the neck. Subsequently, a mortar was fired at Israel from Gaza.

On 24 June 2008, Israel raided the city of Nablus on the West Bank, outside of the cease-fire area, killing a commander of Islamic Jihad and one other Palestinian. Before the raid, unknown militants had fired a mortar into Southern Israel. Later the same day, three Qassam rockets were fired from Gaza into Sderot, Israel, causing two minor injuries; Islamic Jihad claimed responsibility, stating the attack was in response to the Israeli raid. Israel then closed border crossings into Gaza; this was criticized by Hamas which said Israel was "backtracking on the calm". MSNBC has described the violence that day as the truce's "first serious test". Both sides continued to pursue calm afterward.

On 25 June, Israeli forces opened fire against farmers in southeastern Gaza Strip, injuring Salem Ahmed Abu Raida, 82, in the hand. Islamic Jihad threatened to renew rocket fire after the shooting. "We will respond to every Zionist violation at a suitable time," a spokesman Abu Hamza said. Israeli Defense Minister Ehud Barak ordered the closure of all the crossings into the Gaza Strip. In response the Al-Aqsa Martyrs Brigade fired a Qassam rocket at the western Negev the next day.

On 28 June IDF troops killed 7-year-old Mohamed Al Allami during a military operation in the village of Beit Omer, south of Hebron. Islamic Jihad fired a rocket or mortar shell into southern Israel, threatening to resume rocket attacks if Israel continued military operations in the West Bank.

On 29 June a Hamas official in charge of agriculture in the Gaza Strip Mohammad Ramadan Al-Agha said that the IDF was shooting at Gaza's farmers whenever they went to their land near the borders.

On 1 July a Palestinian woman was shot and wounded in the leg by the Israeli Army near the Sufa border crossing in the southern Gaza Strip while she was tending her sheep.

On 10 July Israeli troops killed an unarmed Palestinian near the border in the southern Gaza Strip, an IDF spokesman said. The Al-Aqsa Martyrs Brigades claimed the victim had been one of its members. Palestinians fired two Qassam rockets into Israel's western Negev region, hours after the killing. Hamas arrested three militants from the Al-Aqsa Martyrs Brigades immediately after they launched the rockets at targets in Israel.

On 14 July the PA Ministry of Agriculture said that 75 per cent of agricultural lands in the Gaza Strip had been razed by the IDF.

On 23 July the IDF shot and wounded a Palestinian in the Gaza Strip.

=== Hamas' observance of the ceasefire prior to 4 November 2008 ===
Prior to the incident on 4 November, in which Israeli forces destroyed a cross-border tunnel and killed six of its operatives, Hamas had been scrupulously adhering to the ceasefire – not firing rockets itself and reining in other Palestinian groups. Hamas' adherence to the ceasefire was admitted by official Israeli spokesperson, Mark Regev. In an interview with David Fuller on More4 News (a sister programme of the U.K.'s Channel 4 News) on 9 January 2009, two weeks into Israel's assault on Gaza, Regev explained that "Success is freeing the civilian population of southern Israel from the fear of an incoming Hamas rockets." When Fuller put it to Regev that "there were no Hamas rockets during the ceasefire before 4 November, there were no Hamas rockets for 4 months", Regev replied: "That's correct". Support for Regev's view is found in a document provided to journalists, published by Israel's Meir Amit Intelligence and Terrorism Information Centre: "Hamas was careful to maintain the ceasefire". Despite Israel's refusal to comply with the truce agreement to end the siege, Hamas brought rocket and mortar fire from Gaza to a virtual halt during the summer and fall of 2008. Hamas "tried to enforce the terms of the arrangement" on other Palestinian groups, taking "a number of steps against networks which violated the arrangement," including short-term detention and confiscating their weapons, but it could not completely end the rocket and mortar shell attacks by these rogue factions in Gaza. Hamas had sought support in Gazan public opinion for its policy of maintaining the ceasefire.

=== Violations of the Hamas–Israel agreement by other Gaza organisations ===
A week after the cease-fire agreement was reached, Hamas called on other Palestinian factions to abide by the truce. A rocket attack on Israel by al-Aqsa Martyrs' Brigades was condemned by Hamas as "unpatriotic." Hamas claimed it would imprison anyone, from its own ranks or other groups, caught firing rockets, but also explicitly stated it would not police the border with Israel. On 28 June, Saeb Erekat, the PLO's chief negotiator, called upon all groups to honor the lull, calling it the "supreme Palestinian interest" above all else. The three rocket attacks made from 19 to 28 June led Israel to slow down the re-opening of Gaza border areas. On 29 June, the Intelligence and Terrorism Information Center commented that Hamas preferred to exert outside pressure on the rocket attackers and refused to confront them directly.

Hamas believed that 19 June agreement required it to end rocket attacks upon Israel in exchange for an end of the blockade. According to The New York Times:

It took some days, but they were largely successful. Hamas imposed its will and even imprisoned some of those who were firing rockets. Israeli and United Nations figures show that while more than 300 rockets were fired into Israel in May, 10 to 20 were fired in July, depending on who was counting and whether mortar rounds were included. In August, 10 to 30 were fired, and in September, 5 to 10.

On 5 July Egyptian authorities found weapons and explosives in the Sinai desert they believe were destined for the Gaza Strip. On 8 July the IDF said Gaza militants fired a mortar shell into the western Negev in another violation of the truce. On 11 July Hamas arrested another four members of the Al-Aqsa Martyrs Brigades in the village of Beit Hanoun in the northern Gaza Strip. On 12 and 13 July Gaza militants fired single rockets into Israel

Rocket and mortar attacks continued at a rate of several rockets per month. Shortly after the start of the truce, the Intelligence and Terrorism Information Center commented that "rogue terrorist organizations" opposed to Hamas continued to carry out attacks. Nevertheless, rocket fire decreased 98% in the four and a half months between 18 June and 4 November when compared to the four and a half months preceding the ceasefire, since over 1,894 rockets were fired into Israel from 1 February to 18 June and just 37 were fired between 18 June and the beginning of November. However, the amount of rocket fire was only decreased by about 20% when comparing the lull in November 2008 to the time shortly before Hamas took power in Gaza.

On 20 November 2008, Human Rights Watch wrote an open letter to Ismail Haniyeh, Prime Minister of the Palestinian Authority in Gaza, and Khaled Mishaal, leader of the Islamic Resistance Movement, stating that:

We recognize that until last week Hamas took efforts to halt rocket attacks by other groups as part of the 19 June ceasefire. However, throughout the ceasefire period other armed groups have continued to intermittently fire rockets from Gaza. As the governing authority in the Gaza Strip, it is your responsibility under international law to prevent such attacks, and to arrest and prosecute those who carry them out. We also urge you to take all necessary measures to curb such unlawful attacks whether or not the current ceasefire remains in place or is extended beyond its 19 December deadline. Security forces under your control in Gaza have also demonstrated an ability to curb rocket fire. On at least two occasions, Hamas security personnel arrested people accused of firing rockets. On 10 July at least three members of the Aqsa Martyrs' Brigades were detained for firing rockets. All were later released however, and no charges were brought against them.

=== Blockade agreements ===
The Palestinians who negotiated the cease-fire believed that the commerce in Gaza was to be restored to the levels preceding Israel's withdrawal in 2005 and Hamas's electoral victory. Israeli policy tied the easing of the blockade on success in reducing rocket fire. Israel permitted a 20% increase in goods trucked into Gaza in the pre-lull period, up from 70 to 90 truckloads a day, and that included not only humanitarian supplies but also clothes, shoes, refrigerators, and construction materials. Fuel supplies increased from 55MW worth to 65MW worth. BBC News reported on 11 November that Gaza was then receiving only 28% of the amount of goods traded before the Hamas takeover.

Israel has stated that food imports into the Strip were restricted by its inability to operate at border checkpoints facing constant Palestinian attack, and not because of any Israeli-imposed limits. It has accused Hamas of exacerbating fuel shortages by leading labor union strikes by power plant workers. It has also accused Hamas of underfunding the Gaza health care system, and then blaming the situation on Israel despite its free trade of medical supplies. It maintains that some individuals claiming to require medical attention in Israel were in fact planning terrorist attacks, therefore forcing the government to impose travel restrictions. It also accused Hamas of continuing the smuggling of weapons into the Gaza strip via tunnels to Egypt, pointing out that the rocket attacks had not completely ceased.

Over the one-month period from 4 November to 8 December, about 700 truckloads of goods went into Gaza, which is about the amount of material that would have gone through in a single day without a blockade. Hamas spokesman Fawzi Barhoum said in mid-July that "easing restrictions on Gaza crossings is going very slow and the population doesn't feel that there is basically a real truce and a normal life." Jimmy Carter has stated that he believes the cease-fire could have lasted had Israel been willing to lift the blockade and allow in an "adequate" amount of humanitarian supplies.

=== Gilad Shalit ===
A group of Gaza militants, including Hamas' armed wing Izz ad-Din al-Qassam Brigades, captured Israeli Staff Sergeant Gilad Shalit in June 2006 and had held him as a hostage ever since, connecting his release to the Israel release of Palestinian prisoners. Israel directly tied his release to the cease-fire. However, the issue was not mentioned in the initial cease-fire itself, which led Shalit's father and grandfather to attack the Israeli government. In the early stage of the lull, Israeli officials had stated that they found "a certain sense of progress" on Shalit's release. Hamas considered Shalit's status to be entirely separate from the cease-fire negotiations themselves. It conditioned a deal about his release to the end of the Israeli blockade of Gaza.

The lack of progress in the Egyptian-supervised talks about Shalit severely strained the ceasefire. An offer by Israel in June to release 450 prisoners was rejected by Hamas, who asked for 1,000 prisoners. The Israelis believed that the demands for Shalit's release would increase with time. They also feared a public outcry by people whose relatives died in terrorist attacks perpetrated by the prisoners. Hamas' decisions also alienated it from the government of Egypt, which had linked the opening of the Gaza/Egypt border crossing with Shalit's release. Hamas did not consider the Egyptians to be an honest broker during these talks and looked for another mediator.

== Breaking of the ceasefire ==
On 4 November 2008, the IDF made an incursion at least 250 meters into the Gaza Strip searching for a tunnel, claiming it was intended for the capture of Israeli soldiers and that it intended to continue with the truce, calling the raid a "pinpoint operation". According to Dr. Robert Pastor, senior advisor to the Carter Center, who met with Khaled Meshal, chairman of the Hamas political bureau in Damascus, Hamas asserted that the tunnel was being dug for defensive purposes, not to capture IDF personnel. Pastor added that one IDF official confirmed that fact to him. As six Hamas fighters were killed, Hamas stated that the attack was a "massive breach of the truce". After the Israeli military attack on Hamas in Gaza on 4 November, Hamas resumed intensive rocket attacks on Israel. According to a 17 November article in The Telegraph, "since violence flared on 5 Nov, Israeli forces and militants, some of them from Hamas, have engaged in almost daily tit-for-tat exchanges."

The reliability of the IDF allegation that the tunnel was intended to kidnap Israeli soldiers on the other side of the border has been challenged by various sources. A member of the Carter Centre, involved in negotiations at the time with both Hamas and Israel, reported that Hamas had claimed that the tunnel was defensive against IDF shelling, with an anonymous IDF officer confirming that fact.

Likud MK Yuval Steinitz acknowledged in an al-Jazeera interview on 4 January 2009 that Israel began actively preparing for Operation Cast Lead months beforehand, around June 2008.

== Aftermath ==
On 13 December 2008, Israel announced that it was in favor of extending the cease-fire, provided Hamas adhered to its conditions. The conditions posed by a Hamas delegation in Cairo on 14 December, were that the parties return to the original Hamas-Israel ceasefire arrangement. Hamas would undertake to stop all rocket attacks against Israel if the Israelis would agree to open up the border crossings, not to reduce commercial traffic thereafter, and not to launch attacks in Gaza. At an Israeli Cabinet meeting on 21 December, Yuval Diskin, head of Israel's internal security agency, said he thought Hamas was "interested in continuing the truce, but wants to improve its terms... It wants us to lift the siege [of Gaza], stop attacks, and extend the truce to include [the West Bank]."

On 20 December, Hamas officially announced that they would not be extending the cease-fire, which had expired on 19 December, citing Israeli border closures as the primary reason, and resumed its shelling of the western Negev. Hamas continued to offer a re-establishment of the cease-fire, given the Israeli government would accept its terms. The terms were defined as the lifting of the blockade and a complete ban of military incursions into Gaza. At that time, Hamas also refused European mediation of the talks to release Gilad Shalit, citing Israel's unwillingness to cooperate on a cease-fire agreement.

On 23 December, Mahmoud al-Zahar, a senior Hamas leader, said in a newspaper interview that his group was willing to consider renewing the hudna if Israel refrained from operating in Gaza and lifted its blockade. The same day the IDF killed three Palestinian militants, stating that the militants were planting explosives on the Gaza border. Israel was also reluctant to open the border crossings, which had been closed since November. On 24 December the Negev was hit by more than 60 mortar shells and Katyusha and Qassam rockets, and the IDF was given a green light to operate. Hamas claimed to have fired a total of 87 rockets and mortar rounds that day at Israel, code-naming the firing "Operation Oil Stain".

On 25 December 2008, Israeli Prime Minister Ehud Olmert delivered 'Last Minute' Warning to Gaza in direct appeal to Gaza's people via the Arabic language satellite channel al-Arabiya, to pressure their leaders to stop the barrages. "I am telling them now, it may be the last minute, I'm telling them stop it. We are stronger," he said.

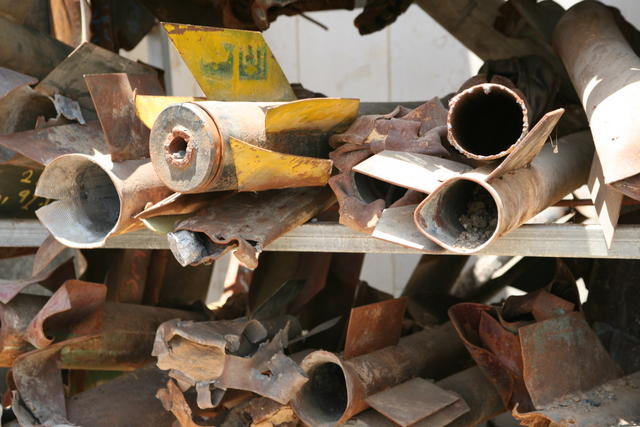
The remnants of Qassam rockets that were fired from the Gaza Strip at Israel

On 26 December 2008, Israel reopened five crossings between Israel and Gaza for humanitarian supplies. Despite the movement of relief supplies, militants fired about a dozen rockets and mortar shells from Gaza at Israel on Friday. Fuel was allowed in for Gaza's main power plant and about 100 trucks loaded with grain, humanitarian aid and other goods were expected during the day. Rocket attacks continued—about a dozen rockets and mortar bombs were fired from Gaza into Israel, one accidentally striking a northern Gaza house and killing two Palestinian sisters, aged five and thirteen, while wounding a third. According to Israeli military officials, the subsequent 27 December Israeli offensive Operation Cast Lead took Hamas by surprise, thereby increasing their casualties.

A poll conducted before the rocket attacks on 24 December indicated that 46% of Israelis did not support the invasion of the Gaza Strip, while 40% did. A poll conducted on 1 January, four days after the operation begun, demonstrated that a decisive majority of Israelis support continuing the army's air campaign against Hamas targets in the Gaza Strip without endangering the lives of Israel Defense Forces soldiers in a ground offensive. On 9 January public opinion poll in Israel indicated that 76% oppose truce without Gilad Shalit.

== Fatalities ==
According to data from B'Tselem, an Israeli human rights organization, at least nineteen Palestinians in the Strip died from Israeli fire during the ceasefire. Three of those were civilians, one of them a 15-year-old adolescent. The group's data also states that no Israeli civilian or Israeli security force personnel were killed by Palestinian attacks from the Strip in the same period.

== See also ==
- 2007–2008 Israel–Gaza conflict
- Blockade of the Gaza Strip
- List of Middle East peace proposals
- Gaza War
- List of Palestinian rocket attacks on Israel, 2008
