= Amān (Islam) =

Islamic term for offering security or pardon to enemies

Amān (Arabic: امان, lit. 'safety, protection, safe conduct') is the Islamic law concept of guaranteeing the security of a person (who is then called mustaʾmin) or a group of people for a limited time. It can represent the assurance of security or clemency granted to enemies who seek protection, and can take the form of a document of safe-conduct for a non-Muslim musta'min or harbi (enemy alien).

== Evolution ==
The concept has pre-Islamic origins, being traced to the practice of jiwār among the Arab tribes, which extended a tribe's protection over an—often outlawed—member of a different tribe. Muhammad extended tribal solidarity and protection to cover the entirety of the Muslim community (Ummah), so the promise of safety could be extended by Muslims to non-Muslims, and formed the basis of the covenants of security (ʿahd) issued to cities or peoples who submitted to the nascent Muslim caliphate, and which rendered these groups protected (dhimmī) under Islamic law.

In later times, the amān became specifically restricted to the concept of safe-passage for a limited time—up to one lunar year—issued to enemies during their stay in Islamic territory, and had the right, within that period of time, to depart, unmolested by the Muslims, to a 'place of safety'. In the eyes of Islamic civil law, a passing mustaʾmin was considered the same as the dhimmīs living under Islamic rule for the duration of his presence in Islamic lands, but differing traditions exist on whether this applied to criminal law as well. Foreign envoys enjoyed automatic amān status, but not merchants or shipwrecked people. As a result, the issuance of amān was a fundamental means of facilitating trade and diplomacy between Muslim and non-Muslim states during the early Middle Ages.

From the late 12th century on, bilateral treaties between Muslim and Christian states that stipulated the rights and obligations of merchants and pilgrims began to replace the amān.

== Amān offered to Muslims ==
Amān could also be issued to Muslims, such as defeated rebels. This was a widespread practice during the early Islamic period even though, as Joseph Schacht observes: "they are, strictly speaking, superfluous or even incompatible with religious law".

== See also ==
- Glossary of Islam
- Outline of Islam
- Diplomatic immunity
- Futuwwa, concept of moral behavior similar to Western chivalry in the medieval Arab and Muslim world
- Hudna, truce or armistice in Islam
- Istijarah, Islamic term for asylum
- List of Islamic terms in Arabic
- Sulh, Arabic word meaning "resolution" or "fixing" in general, frequently used in the context of social problems
- Tahdiya, Arabic for "calming" or "quieting"; stands for calming down hostilities without completely stopping them

== Sources ==
- Schacht, J. (1960). "Amān". In Gibb, H. A. R.; Kramers, J. H.; Lévi-Provençal, E.; Schacht, J.; Lewis, B. & Pellat, Ch. (eds.). The Encyclopaedia of Islam, Second Edition. Volume I: A–B. Leiden: E. J. Brill. pp. 429–430. OCLC 495469456.
