= Mounira Solh =

Lebanese activist (1911–2010)

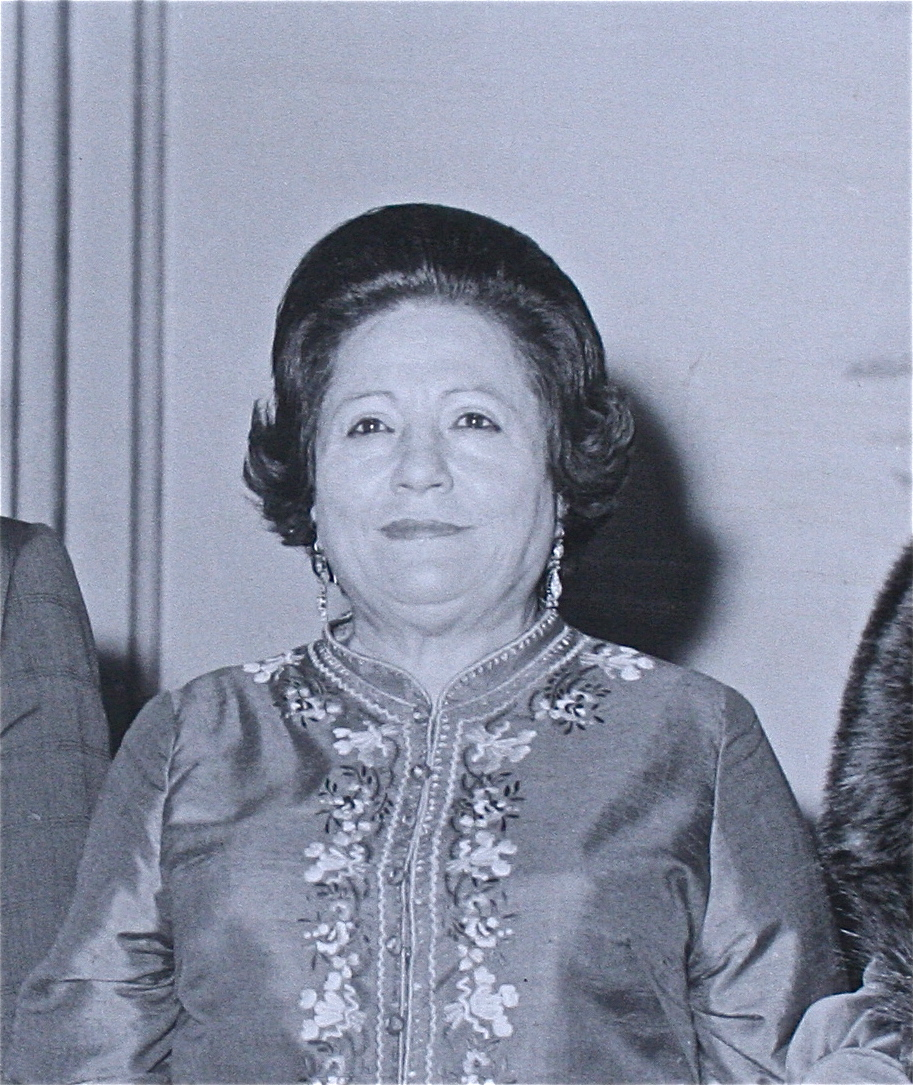
- Solh in Beirut, 1974
- Born: 19 September 1911
- Died: 27 November 2010 (aged 99)
- Education: Lebanese American University
- Occupations: Founder, Al Amal Institute for the Disabled
- Spouse: Waheed el Solh
- Children: Sana Solh

Mounira Solh (Arabic: منيرة صلح; 19 September 1911 – 27 November 2010) was a pioneer advocate of women's and disabled people's rights in Lebanon. She was one of the earliest female candidates to run for parliament in Lebanon and the Middle East. She ran for a seat in the Parliament of Lebanon in 1960, 1964 and 1968. She was also a humanitarian with several decades of volunteer and charity work.

Mounira Solh founded Al Amal Institute for the Disabled, which was the first of its kind in the Arab world and in Lebanon in 1959. The first of its kind in Lebanon, the Association of the Parents of Mentally Disabled Children, was also established by Solh in 1984.

== Life and work ==
Mounira Solh is arguably the most prominent female leader of the demonstrations that resulted in Lebanon's independence in 1943. Her campaign for a Beirut seat in 1960 declared her the first Muslim woman who ran for parliamentary elections in Lebanon and likely in the Arab world. She was a strong supporter of women's rights. She was a candidate to the legislative elections in Lebanon twice after that, in 1964 and 1968. She was never elected.

Mounira Solh, who graduated in 1933 from the American Junior College for Women (which is now referred to as the Lebanese American University), was among the first women in Lebanon and the Arab world to attend college. Shortly after, she travelled to Baghdad, Iraq, where she spent two years teaching and helped revamp the national school curriculum. Despite her father's disapproval, she married her first cousin, Wahid Solh, after she returned to Lebanon in 1935. She and her new husband eloped to British Mandatory Palestine for several months before returning home after finding out that her father approved of her marriage.

Mounira Solh persistently pushed for the advancement of laws pertaining to women and people with disabilities alongside other pioneering women. In 1951, she became a member of the Lebanese Council of Women. She was also active in humanitarian and charity work, and led the national team of relief volunteers to help victims of the Beirut Great Fire in 1956.

A year after her husband's assassination during the 1958 civil war, Mounira Solh established the Al Amal Institute for the Disabled. She was inspired by her desire to help her son Salim and other children with disability. In 1968, she became a member of Rehabilitation International, the world's leading organization for disability rights. That same year, she was elected vice-president of the Lebanese Council of Women and in 1970 she became a life member of the International Council of Women. She earned a special distinction from U.S. President Richard Nixon after attending three annual conferences between 1970 and 1972 of the U.S. President's Committee on Employment of People with Disabilities, Washington D.C. In her struggle to advance the rights of women and people with disability, Mounira Solh has officially represented Lebanon at various international conferences around the world including in Lisbon, Tokyo, Sydney and Mexico.

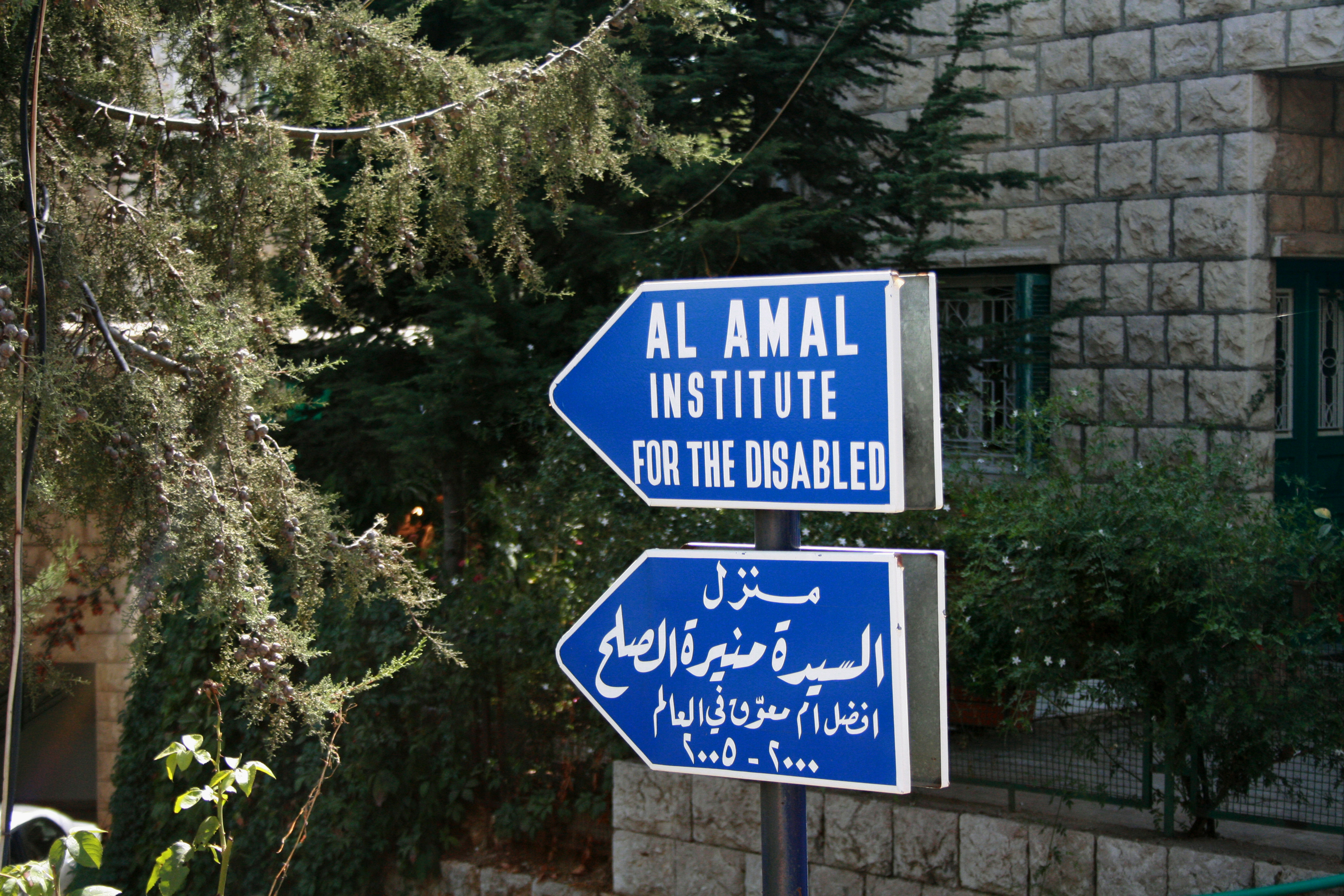
Al Amal Institute for the Disabled in Broumana, Lebanon

Mounira Solh celebrated in 2009 the 50th anniversary of Al Amal Institute for the Disabled in a Golden Jubilee Ceremony during which a special film on her lifetime achievements and pioneering humanitarian work was screened.

Mounira Solh died on 27 November 2010. She was 99 years old. Her daughter Sana and son Nassib continue to run Al Amal Institute for the Disabled in Broumana, Lebanon.

== Family ==
Mounira Solh hails from a prominent family which gave Lebanon four prime ministers, Riad Solh, Sami Solh, Takieddine Solh and Rachid Solh. The Solh family is originally from the ancient port city of Sidon in southern Lebanon. Her father, Abdel Rahim Solh, is a Sunni Muslim, and her mother, Mahiba Ashkar, a Maronite Catholic Christian from Broumana, a resort town in the Metn mountains east of Beirut. Mounira Solh had five children: Samir (had severe disabilities, deceased at a young age), Najla (died from illness at a young age), Salim (had mental disabilities, 1942–2002), Sana and Nassib. She had nine grandchildren: Assaad, Nadim and Nayla Razzouk, Nael and Hala Raad, and Wahid, Mounira, Omar and Maria Solh.

== Education ==
Mounira Solh completed her schooling at the American School in the city of Tripoli, northern Lebanon, in 1929. She later went on to attend the American Junior College for Women (the Lebanese American University today) from where she graduated in 1933.

In 1950, she received a Nursing Certificate from the Lebanese Red Cross.

In 1975, she was awarded a Diploma for a Study Workshop on Disablement and Rehabilitation from the Selly Oak Colleges in Birmingham, U.K.

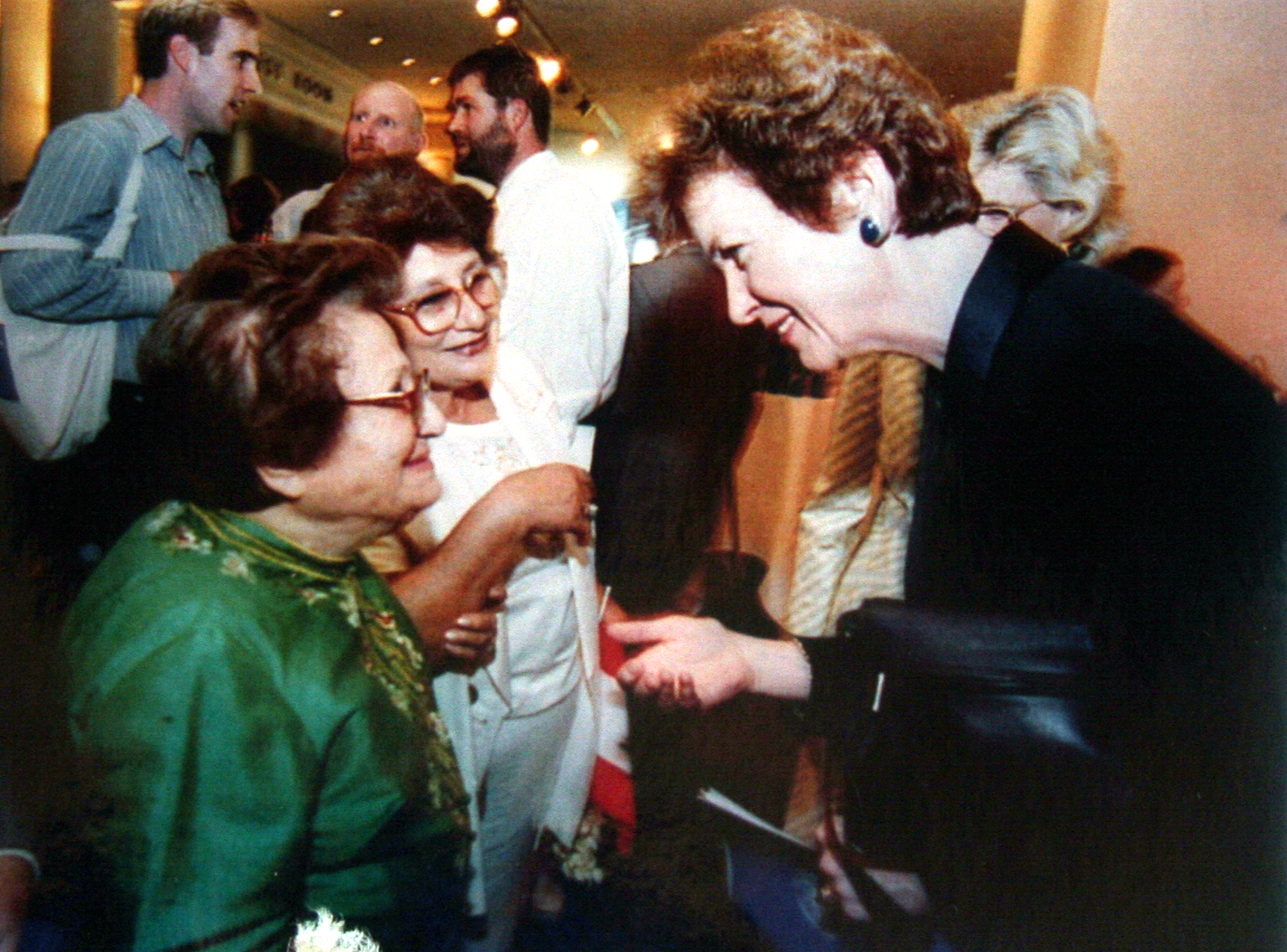
Mrs. Mounira Solh receives congratulations from Mrs. Mary Robinson for the Rose Fitzgerald Kennedy Mothers' Leadership Award 2000–2005 in Seattle, WA, in 2000.

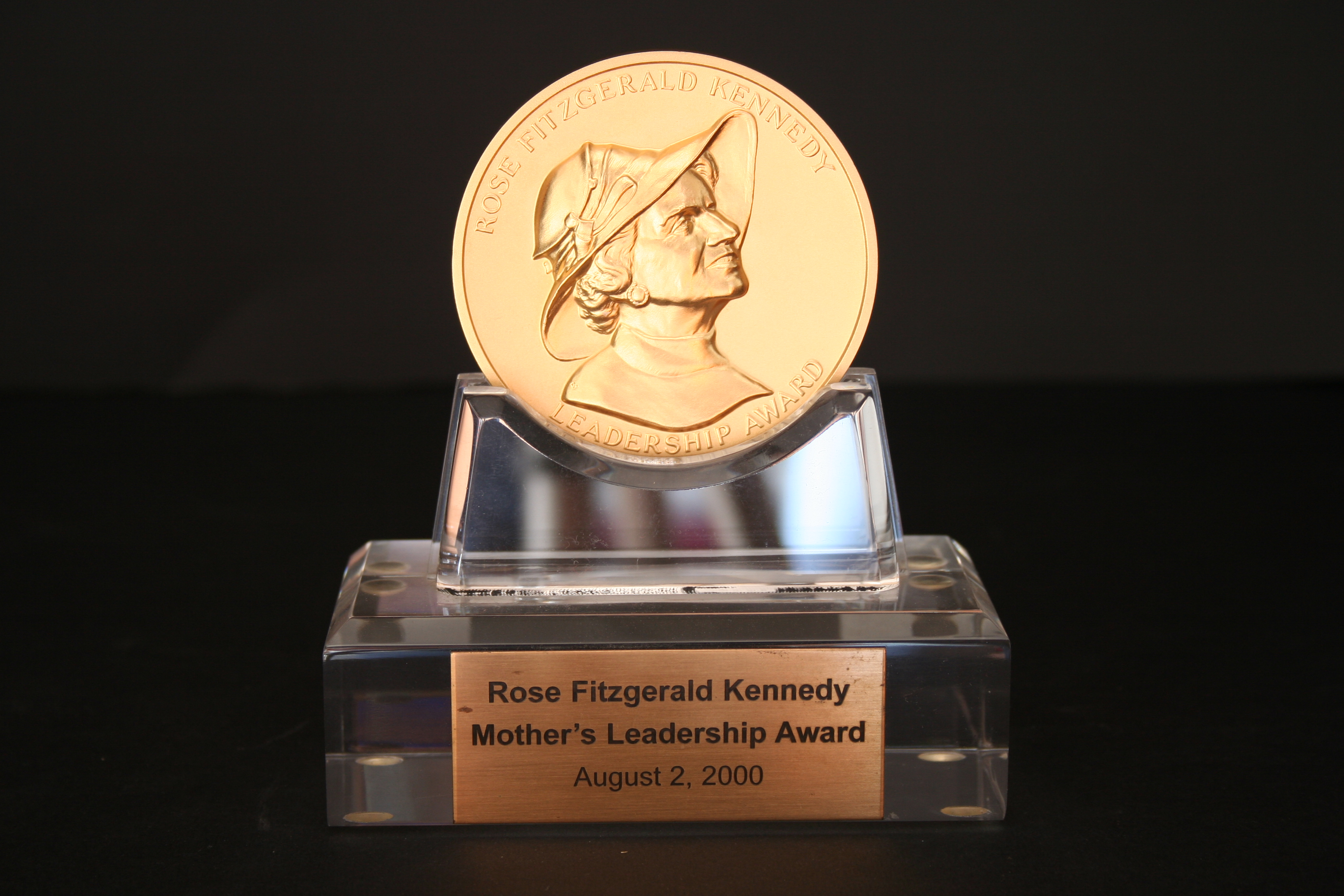
Mrs. Mounira Solh's Rose Fitzgerald Kennedy Mothers' Leadership Award 2000-2005

== Awards and distinctions ==
- Mounira Solh is the recipient of numerous awards, including the National Order of the Cedar, granted by the President of the Republic in 2000.
- She is the recipient of the prestigious Rose Fitzgerald Kennedy Mothers' Leadership Award 2000-2005 which celebrates a mother of a child with intellectual disability "who has demonstrated outstanding leadership and long standing commitment to the development and improvement of services, advocacy, or public policy on behalf of her son or daughter or others with mental retardation."

She also received the following awards:

- Mothers of Lebanon distinction from Haigazian University, Beirut, Lebanon, in May 2004
- Arab Woman Award by the Hariri Foundation in 2002
- Gold Award by the President of the Lebanese Republic in 1995
- Public Health medal by the President of the Lebanese Republic in 1974
- Special Distinction from Rehabilitation International in Sydney, Australia, 1972
- Special Distinction at the U.S. President's Committee on Employment of People with Disabilities, Washington D.C in 1972
