= Sindicatum =

Sindicatum Sustainable Resources
- Company type: Privately Held
- Industry: Environmental Services Private Equity
- Founded: 2005
- Headquarters: Singapore
- Key people: Assaad W. Razzouk, CEO; Michael Boardman, CFO; Robert Driscoll, Non-Executive Director; Tom Daschle, Non-Executive Director, Sobhi Hatem, Non-Executive Director
- Products: Project management
- Number of employees: 104
- Website: www.sindicatum.com

Sindicatum Renewable Energy is an Asia-focused renewable energy company headquartered in Singapore. Sindicatum Renewable Energy is a developer, owner and operator of renewable energy projects principally in India, Indonesia, Thailand and the Philippines. Sindicatum moved its headquarters from London to Singapore in 2009 to be closer to its assets, most of which are in Asia.

Sindicatum finances, executes and applies technologies to its projects and its team of engineers, technicians and climate change specialists working across several renewable energy markets to identify opportunities, develop solutions, implement projects and oversee their operation.

In 2018, Sindicatum issued $60 million of green bonds listed on the London Stock Exchange.

Sindicatum is headquartered in Singapore and has business units and offices in New Delhi, Bangkok, Jakarta, London, Beijing, Taiyuan and the Philippines.

== Awards ==
Sindicatum won the following awards:

-International Finance Awards, Most Sustainable Energy Company - Singapore and Most Innovative Renewable Energy Company - Singapore, December 2018

-Sustainable Business Awards Singapore for Best SME also obtains a special recognition for its performance in Land Use and Biodiversity, July 2018

-Singapore Apex Corporate Sustainability Award for Sustainable Business (SME Category), November 2017

-The Green Organisation’s Green World Ambassador Award, June 2015

-Thailand Energy Awards 2014 for renewable energy projects associated with the transmission system (on-grid), December 2014

-Environmental Finance 2014 Market Awards, Best Project Developer and Best Primary Originator, December 2014

-The Green Organisation’s Green World Ambassador and Green Apple Awards for its commitment to large-scale renewable energy production and GHG emission reductions, November 2014

-Singapore Sustainability Award (SME Category) by the Singapore Business Federation, October 2014

-Leadership in Sustainability award at the British Chamber of Commerce Singapore’s 15th Annual Business Awards, October 2014

-ASEAN Energy Awards 2014 under ‘On Grid – National Grid’ category of Renewable Energy Project Awards for its Thai Landfill-Gas-to-Energy (“LFGE”) projects, October 2014

-Energy Institute ‘Energy Excellence’ Award for its Duerping Project in China in 2012. Sindicatum’s Duerping Project was designed to optimise energy recovery from waste gas extracted from a coal mine that was previously vented to the atmosphere. Sindicatum competed with GlaxoSmithKline, the UK’s National Grid and others. Sindicatum Sustainable Resources Group also won the 2012 Commodity Business Award for Excellence in Renewable Energy Markets, as well as special commendations for Excellence in Emission Markets and Excellence in Policy and Advisory. Sindicatum competed with EDF, Morgan Stanley, Thomson Reuters Point Carbon and many others.

-Awards won by Sindicatum in 2011 include the Excellence in Renewable Energy Markets Award and a Special Commendation in the Commodity Market Policy and Advisory category by the Commodity Business Awards, the Renewable Energy and the Carbon Reduction Green Business Awards, the Carbon Finance Transaction of the Year award by Environmental Finance and the Most Progressive Corporate Leader award by the Association for Sustainable & Responsible Investment in Asia or ASrIA, awarded to Assaad W. Razzouk, Group CEO.
