= Sulh =

Arabic term used in Islamic jurisprudence

Abdullah Mansour of Kfar Kasem shakes hands with the veteran Shomer Avraham Shapira at the traditional "Sulha" gathering in Kfar Kasem following the massacre that took place there.

Sulh (Arabic: صلح, romanized: ṣulḥ) is an Arabic word meaning 'resolution' or 'fixing' generally, in problem solving. It is frequently used in the context of social problems. It is also an Arabic surname, mostly from Lebanon used in the variant Solh. in other words, it means dispute resolution among individuals or people with misunderstanding.

== Usage ==
In Quranic Arabic, ṣulḥ is used as a term signifying an agreement or settlement over a property dispute and retains this sense in later Islamic legal usage. In Bedouin customary law, it can signify a settlement of a tribal feud and in modern Arabic usage, it is applied to treaties, such as ṣulḥ Versailles (the Treaty of Versailles). In general, it reflects a sense of resolution of conflict through negotiation. The two parties select respected individuals to mediate the conflict, a truce (hudna) is declared, a settlement is reached that maintains the honor and status of both parties, and a public ritual takes place. Particularly important is the fact that the practice affirms bonds between groups and not just individuals. It averts a cycle of revenge.

Ṣulḥ, in its sense of conflict mediation, has always been an important means of resolving disputes. In the Middle Ages, qadis could ratify an amicable settlement reached by litigants. It is still common in rural areas where governmental systems of justice have little force.

== In Muslim political thought ==
In the early days of the Islamic Empire, ṣulḥ, in the sense of 'treaty' or 'armistice', typically meant that a region had "surrendered on terms" or similarly during the Ottoman retreat it preceded a region's independence. Typically, it signified an area that was ruled and administered by its local political structure but acknowledged itself as a subject through the payment of tribute.

In the Muslim world view on divisions of the world the region called the Dār al-‘Ahd (دار العهد 'house of truce'), sometimes referred to as Dār aṣ-Ṣulḥ (دار الصلح 'house of treaty') or Dār al-Hudna (دار الهدنة 'house of calm'), was seen as an intermediate to Dār al-Islām (دار الإسلام 'house/abode of Islam'), or Dār as-Salām (دار السلام 'house/abode of peace'), and Dār al-Ḥarb (دار الحرب 'house of war').

Dār aṣ-Ṣulḥ, was then seen as non-Muslim territory that had concluded an armistice with Muslims, and had agreed to protect Muslims and their clients and interests within its borders. Often this implied a tributary situation, however modern writings also include friendly countries in Dār aṣ-Ṣulḥ. By no means was this particular division, however, recognized by all Muslim jurists, and due to historical changes these concepts have little significance today.

== See also ==
- Aman (Islam) or amān, assurance of security or clemency granted to enemies who seek protection
- List of Islamic terms in Arabic
- Tahdia, Arabic language for 'calming' or 'quieting', referring to the calming down of hostilities but not a complete stop to them
