= Lionel Barber =

British journalist

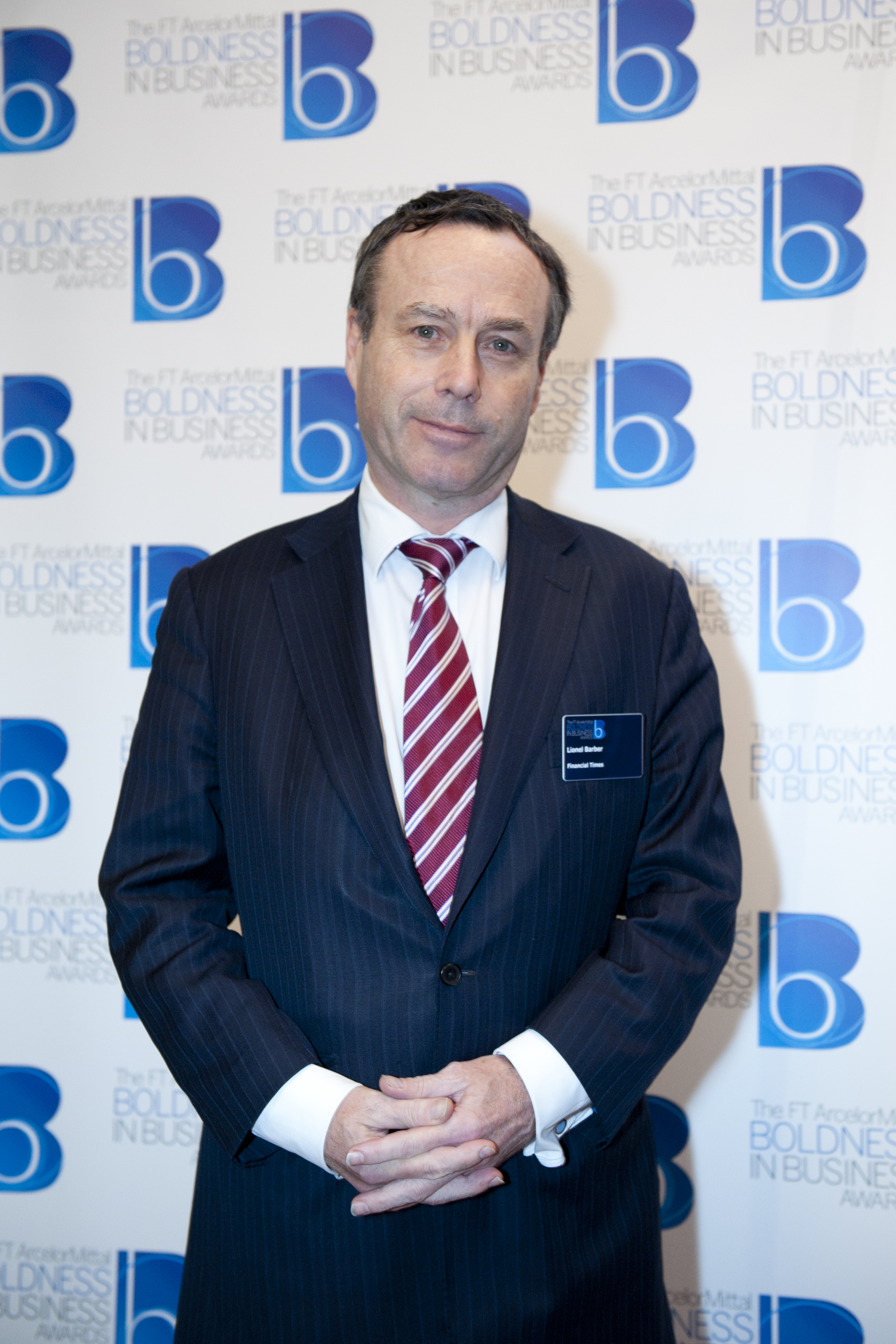
- At the Boldness in Business Awards in London, 2013
- Born: 18 January 1955 (age 71)
- Education: Dulwich College; St Edmund Hall, Oxford
- Occupation: Journalist
- Title: Editor of the Financial Times (2005–2020)
- Spouse: Victoria Greenwood
- Children: 2

Lionel Barber (born 18 January 1955) is an English journalist. He was editor of the Financial Times (FT) from 2005 to 2020. Barber worked at The Scotsman and The Sunday Times before working at the FT from the mid-1980s.

Barber was a well-regarded editor of the FT. He was credited with raising its journalistic standards, transforming it into a global brand, navigating its transition into the digital era, growing readership, and managing its takeover by Nikkei.

== Early life and career ==
Barber was born on 18 January 1955 to a journalist father. He was educated at Dulwich College, an independent school for boys in Dulwich in South London, and at St Edmund Hall, Oxford, graduating in 1978 with an upper second joint honours degree in German and modern history. He worked for a company in Germany as an interpreter, before being offered a job on the Thomson regional training scheme.

Barber began his career in journalism in 1978 as a reporter for The Scotsman. In 1981, after being named Young Journalist of the Year in the British Press Awards, he became a business correspondent at The Sunday Times, having been interviewed by its editor Frank Giles.

By 1982 he was the Enterprising Britain correspondent (a title used to denote the position that became known as industrial correspondent). The co-writer of several books, his works include a history of Reuters news agency (The Price of Truth, 1985) and the Westland affair (Not with Honour, 1986).

== At the Financial Times ==
Barber joined the Financial Times in 1985. His positions at the paper included Washington correspondent and US editor (1986–1992), Brussels bureau chief (1992–1998), and news editor (1998–2000). He was formerly the editor of the FT Continental European edition (2000–2002), during which he briefed US president George W. Bush ahead of his first trip to Europe.

In November 2005, he was appointed editor of the Financial Times, having believed the newspaper was in need of a different editor. In his capacity as editor, Barber interviewed figures including Barack Obama, Wen Jiabao, Dmitry Medvedev, Vladimir Putin, Luiz Inácio Lula da Silva, Angela Merkel, David Cameron and Manmohan Singh.

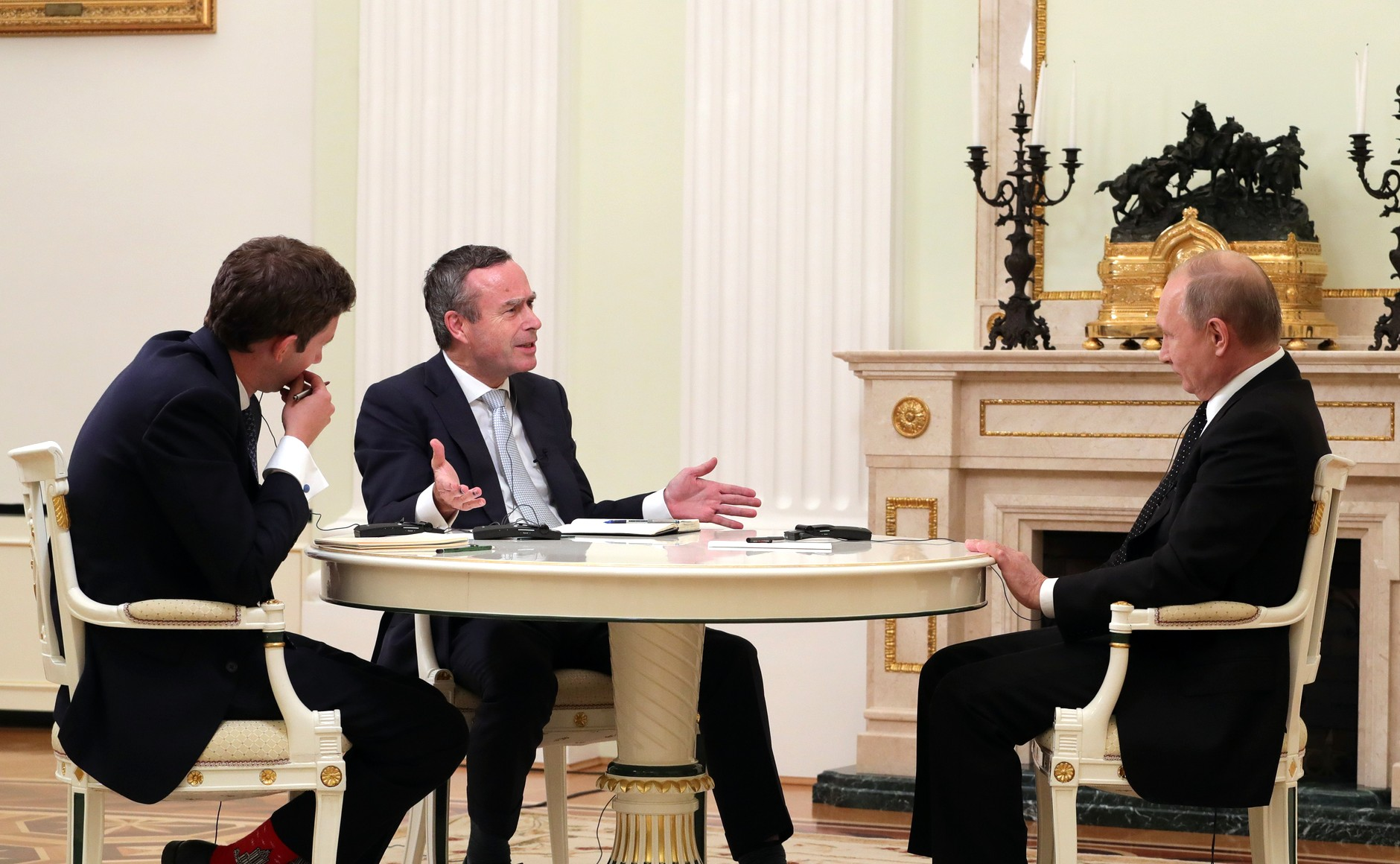
Barber and the Financial Times' Henry Foy interviewing Russian president Vladimir Putin in 2019

In July 2012, Barber was accused of intimidating and threatening a member of staff at the Financial Times. Steve Lodge, who worked as a personal finance writer at the newspaper, was brought before a disciplinary panel following an incident in which the Financial Times claimed demonstrated he "had a problem working for women". Barber was accused of "losing his temper and raising his voice" in a manner that breached the newspaper's procedures.

In October 2018, he said it was "time for a revolution" at the newspaper after sharing a reader's letter that criticised it for a "lack of diversity" among its columnists. Barber stepped down from the role on 17 January 2020 after 14 years as editor, and was succeeded by Roula Khalaf. Barber's 14 year tenure made him the second longest-serving editor in the FT's history, after Sir Gordon Newton.

In 2019, Barber received pay and pension benefits worth £1.92 million, according to accounts published at Companies House. This led to a halt in pay negotiations.

== After the Financial Times ==
In 2020, Barber began presenting What Next?, an interview podcast for LBC.

Barber published a memoir covering his editorship of the FT in 2020, entitled The Powerful and the Damned: Private Diaries in Turbulent Times.

In 2021, Barber joined a consortium of 9 other investors, that included former BBC Director-General and The New York Times Company chief executive Mark Thompson, to purchase The New European newspaper for an undisclosed sum.

Since 2023, Barber has presented Prospect magazine's weekly podcast, Media Confidential, with Alan Rusbridger.

In 2024, Barber's biography of Masayoshi Son, Gambling Man, was published by Penguin.

== Awards and recognition ==
Barber has received a number of awards and distinctions for his journalistic work.

- In 1981, he was named Young Journalist of the Year in the British Press Awards. In 1998, he was named one of the 101 most influential Europeans by Le Nouvel Observateur.
- In 1985, he was the Laurence Stern fellow at The Washington Post. In 1992, he was a visiting scholar at the University of California, Berkeley, working under Nelson Polsby at the Institute of Governmental Studies. In 1996, he was a visiting fellow at the Robert Schuman Centre at the European University Institute in Florence.
- In 2009, Barber was awarded the St George Society medal of honour for his contribution to journalism in the transatlantic community. In February 2011, he was appointed to the board of trustees at The Tate. He also serves on the board of trustees of the Carnegie Corporation of New York.
- In 2016, he was made a Chevalier (knight) in the French Ordre National de la Légion d'Honneur for his "contribution to high-quality journalism, and the Financial Times' positive role in the European debate".
- In 2020, Barber received the Gerald Loeb Lifetime Achievement Award for excellence in business journalism.

== Personal life ==
Barber's wife, Victoria Greenwood, is a criminologist. Barber has a daughter and a son, born in Washington, D.C. in 1988 and 1990. As of 2008, he lives in London. He is fluent in French and German.

== Bibliography ==
- Ralph Lawrenson, John; Barber, Lionel (1985). The Price of Truth: The Story of the Reuters £££ Millions. Mainstream Publishing. ISBN 9780722154878.
- Barber, Lionel (1998). Britain and the New European Agenda. Centre for European Reform. ISBN 9781901229073.
- Bilefsky, Dan; Hall, Ben; Barber, Lionel, eds. (1998). The Birth of the Euro: The Financial Times's Guide to EMU. Penguin. ISBN 0140280022.
- Barber, Lionel, ed. (2013). Lunch with the FT: 52 Classic Interviews. Penguin. ISBN 9781591846499.
- Barber, Lionel, ed. (2019). Lunch with the FT: A Second Helping. Penguin Books. ISBN 9780241400715.
- Appiah, Kwame Anthony & Lionel Barber (Winter 2019). "The unity in disunity : looking at the world of globalization". Carnegie Conversation. Carnegie Reporter. 11 (1). Moderated by Scott Malcomson: 8–15.
- Barber, Lionel (2020). The Powerful and the Damned: Private Diaries in Turbulent Times. WH Allen. ISBN 9780753558188.
- Barber, Lionel (2024). Gambling Man: The Wild Ride of Japan's Masayoshi Son. Penguin Books. ISBN 9780241582725.

Media offices
Preceded by Andrew Gowers	Editor of the Financial Times; 2005–2020	Succeeded by Roula Khalaf
