= List of Palestinian rocket attacks on Israel in 2008 =

The following is a list of 2008 rocket and mortar attacks on Israel, by Hamas and Palestinian militants from the Gaza Strip. This was part of a rapid escalation of attacks by Hamas on Israel. Until the ceasefire on June 19, 2008, 2378 rockets and mortars were launched. This is more than the 1,639 attacks launched in all of 2007, the rate of fire per month had increased more than 240%. A six-month 2008 Israel–Hamas ceasefire was agreed to by both sides and began on June 19, 2008. Sporadic attacks continued during the cease-fire at a vastly diminished rate; a total of 20 rockets and 18 mortars were launched from the signing of the ceasefire until the beginning of November. This represented a 98% reduction in rocket fire 4 1/2-month period prior to the signing of the ceasefire during which over 1,800 rockets were fired from Gaza. On November 4, the Israeli military attacked a cross-border tunnel on the Gaza side, killing two Hamas gunman. The resulted in rocket and mortar attacks and subsequent Israel Air Force strikes on launching sites and killed an additional four Hamas gunmen. Israeli officials allege Hamas was constructing a tunnel to be used to abduct Israeli soldiers. Following this event the number of rockets fired from Gaza escalated, 125 being launched in the month of November. This page lists rocket attacks on Israel by Palestinian terrorists. According to the Israeli military's count on December 27, 3,000 rockets hit Israel since the beginning of the year.

A total of eight people were killed by Qassam rocket, Grad rocket and mortar attacks on Israel in 2008. Four of these deaths occurred between 27 and 29 December.

== Visual summary ==
Rockets and mortars launched from the Gaza Strip in 2008
Type	Jan	Feb	Mar	Apr	May	June	Jul	Aug	Sept	Oct	Nov	Dec	Total
Mortar	136	228	103	373	206	158	8	3	3	1	68	241	1528
Rockets	241	257	196	145	149	87	4	8	1	1	125	361	1575

Rockets by month.

Mortars by month.

Combined rockets and mortars by month.

== January ==
January 3, 2008
Palestinian terrorists fired a long-range Grad Iranian-supplied Katyusha rocket at northern Ashkelon, the longest reach of a Palestinian rocket (16.5 to 20 km). This rocket landed further north than any rocket since the rocket fire began seven years ago - 16.5 kilometers (10.3 mi). No one was hurt in the attack, though the missile landed only some 50 meters (55 yards) from a residential neighborhood. The Katyusha rocket fired at Ashkelon, a Grad model 122 millimeters (nearly 5 inches) in diameter, was the fifth such rocket fired towards Ashkelon. The use of the Katyusha rocket could bring a quarter million Israelis within rocket range (International Herald Tribune). Israel sent aircraft and tanks to hit buildings used by rocket launchers, killing twelve Palestinians including two to four civilians.
Palestinians responded to Israel's strikes with a barrage of seven Qassam rockets, one of which hit the yard of a house in the town of Sderot. 25 other rockets were also fired by Palestinians at Israeli towns and forces in the Western Negev.
January 4, 2008
Eight mortar shells were fired by Palestinians at southern Israel.
Palestinians operating from Gaza launched six Qassam rockets at the western Negev on Friday, one of which struck the yard of a home in the town of Sderot, causing damage. One boy was lightly injured and evacuated to a hospital. Several residents suffered from shock.
Meanwhile, a Qassam rocket hit a western Negev open field Friday morning. No damage or injuries were reported.
January 9, 2008
At least ten Qassam rockets and twelve mortar shells were fired into Israel. Two of the twelve Qassam rockets "directly struck houses" in Sderot. This attack, coincided with the arrival of US President George W. Bush for a three-day visit. One of the missiles slammed into a house, landing in a young child's bedroom. The three-week-old baby had been taken by his mother to the shelter as soon as the Red Color alert siren sounded.
The Israel Air Force targeted an Islamic Jihad terrorist cell that was firing mortar bombs from Beit Lahiyeh in northern Gaza, killing two terrorists and wounding six others, according to both Israeli and PA sources.
January 10, 2008
At least one Qassam rocket was fired into Israel hitting the Kibbutz Yad Mordechai in the western Negev about "100 meters from the cafeteria."
January 13, 2008
Eight mortar bombs were fired at Israel, including one that exploded in Netiv HaAsarah, just north of Gaza, causing damage to a building.
January 15, 2008 – January 18, 2008
Twenty-eight rockets hit the western Negev on January 15. One scored a direct hit on a home, wounding five people, including Lior Ben-Shimol, age 5, from Sderot, and a 19-year-old boy who was lightly injured from shrapnel. On January 15, terror emanating from the Hamas-controlled Gaza Strip sharply escalated. The Israel Ministry of Foreign Affairs states that than 100 rockets and mortars were fired from Gaza on the Israeli cities of Sderot and Ashkelon on January 15. More than 120 Qassam rockets and 65 mortars were fired towards the Western Negev, in a 72-hour period. The attacks injured more than eight Israelis, and two of the rockets struck near a kindergarten, which was full of children at the time of the attack.
January 18, 2008 – January 28, 2008
There were 30 identified rocket hits from January 18 to January 28 (Hamas claimed responsibility for most) and 83 mortar shell hits.

== February ==
February 5, 2008
An 8-year-old boy and his older brother were seriously wounded Saturday when a rocket from Gaza slammed into the Israeli border town of Sderot. Their mother and a third brother were brought to the hospital suffering shock
Israeli aircraft had earlier in the day struck twice in Gaza in an effort to thwart the launchings, the army said. One terrorist was seriously injured, medics said.
February 6, 2008
Two girls, aged twelve and two, were injured when a Qassam rocket fired from northern Gaza landed near a kindergarten in a kibbutz in the Eshkol Regional Council in the western Negev. Their mother suffered from shock. A house in Sderot was also damaged. The Popular Resistance Committees claimed responsibility for the attack.
February 25, 2008
Palestinian terrorists fire five Qassam rockets at Israeli towns. One of which fell near a school in Sderot, 10-year-old Yossi Chymov, was critically injured in the attack.
February 27, 2008
About 50 Qassam rockets were fired towards the Negev, one of which struck a parking lot near Sapir Academic College, killing 47-year-old student Ron Yahye. Hamas, the Popular Resistance Committees and the Palestinian Islamic Jihad carried this rocket barrage. In addition, they fired for the first time six Iranian built Grad missiles (also known as Katyushas, which actually refers to the original launcher) at the industrial city of Ashkelon. While only a few people were lightly injured, this longer distance attack on a larger Israeli city had a major psychological effect. The Israeli Prime Minister and several other minister vowed a tough response. The IAF retaliated with more airstrikes in Jabalia camp and the northern part of Gaza Strip. About seven killed in the attacks, most of whom were terrorists, however a six-month-old baby was also killed after a missile struck a house in the camp.
February 28, 2008
A 13-month-old Gaza girl was killed by flying shrapnel when a Qassam missile launched from Gaza at Israel fell short and landed near her home.

== March ==
March 1, 2008
About 50 rockets were fired in a span of 12 hours.
One Israeli 8 year-old had his leg amputated in a rocket attack. One Israeli civilian was killed in a rocket attack in Sderot. A much larger number of civilians were wounded or treated for shock.
March 13, 2008
A Qassam rocket was shot at Ashkelon from Gaza. The rocket, the first in two days, landed in an open area in southern Ashkelon. The Popular Front for the Liberation of Palestine, a secular left-wing group, claimed responsibility.
March 19, 2008
Two rockets were fired at the Sha'ar Hanegev Regional Council.
March 20, 2008
A rocket landed within the Sha'ar Hanegev Regional Council limits during the Jewish holiday of Purim. The previous day, a 49-year-old rabbi was stabbed and wounded by a terrorist of the Free Sons of the Galilee Brigades near the Damascus Gate in Jerusalem.

== April ==
April 17, 2008
Seventeen rockets were fired at the western Negev near Ashkelon.
April 18, 2008
Sixteen Qassam rockets were fired at Israel. One rocket hit power lines and another hit a residential block in Sderot.
April 21, 2008
Palestinian forces operating out of the Gaza Strip on Monday fired at least nine rockets and mortar shells at communities in southern Israel, wounding a four-year-old Israeli boy (light injuries from a piece of shrapnel) and damaging a number of homes.
April 22, 2008
One missile fired from northern Gaza hit the southern industrial zone of the Israeli coastal city of Ashkelon.
April 29, 2008
More than 15 Qassam rockets and 20 mortar shells were fired on Israel throughout the day, with two of the Qassam rockets and eight of the mortar shells landing within and around western Negev towns.
April 30, 2008
At least two rockets fired by Gaza-based Palestinian forces slammed into the southern Israel town of Sderot while local residents were attending a Holocaust memorial ceremony on Wednesday evening.

== May ==
May 1, 2008
Terrorists from Gaza fired at least 10 rockets at Sderot and neighboring communities. One rocket landed next to an Israeli high school. A number of students suffered from shock.
May 9, 2008
On Friday a 48-year-old Jimmy Kdoshim was killed by a mortar shell while working in his garden in Kibbutz Kfar Aza. Palestinian terrorists from the Islamist group Hamas, who regularly fire rockets and mortars into Israel from Gaza, claimed responsibility.
May 10, 2008
Two rockets land in Ashkelon; one near a school at 7 AM, shortly before the children would arrive
May 11, 2008
On Sunday afternoon, the Islamic Jihad's military wing, the Al-Quds Brigades fired two Qassam rockets at the western Negev. One of the rockets landed at the parking lot of Sapir College, causing a woman to suffer shock and damaging some vehicles. The other rocket landed in Sderot near a bus carrying schoolchildren. Three children suffered shock and were treated by Magen David Adom paramedics. The bus' windows were shattered and a fire broke out nearby.
May 12, 2008
Shuli Katz, a 70-year-old resident of Kibbutz Gvaram was killed early Monday evening from a Palestinian Qassam rocket which crashed into the backyard of a residential home in Yesha – a small community belonging to the Eshkol Regional Council. A 50-year-old man was treated for shock. The Al-Quds Brigades, the military wing of the Islamic Jihad, claimed responsibility for the deadly attack.
May 13, 2008
Five Qassam rockets are fired at Israel.
May 14, 2008
A Katyusha rocket (also referred to as a Grad) was fired into the Israeli city of Ashkelon, it struck a clinic in the third floor of the Huzot shopping mall at 6:00 pm. This attack resulted in three people seriously injured (one was an eight-year-old girl), two moderately injured and eleven people suffered minor wounds. The Popular Front for the Liberation of Palestine-General Command said its fighters launched the rocket.
May 15, 2008
Hours after President Bush's arrival for a state visit a rocket launched by Gaza terrorists landed on a shopping mall in Ashkelon, Israel's southernmost city on the Mediterranean coast, injuring more than 30 people.
May 18, 2008
Some 15 rockets hit the Sderot area on Sunday.
May 19, 2008
A 35-year-old woman was killed and two others wounded Monday evening when a Qassam rocket struck a car in the western Negev town of Sderot. The woman, Shir-El Friedman, was standing next to the car at the time of the strike and was taken to Barzilai Hospital in Ashkelon. Hospital spokeswoman Lea Malul said she died on the way to the hospital.
According to the IDF, a total of 15 rockets were fired at the area on Monday. Hamas, Islamic Jihad, and the Popular Resistance Committees claimed responsibility.
May 24, 2008
Four rockets fired towards western Negev on Saturday, two of them confirmed as longer-range Grads. Residents awaken to first barrage at 6:40 am as the Red Color alter sirens blared. The first two rockets landed in the Nahal Oz region. The two remaining rockets were longer-range Grads. One landed in Netivot and other near Ma'agalim. No injuries or damage reported. Throughout the day barrages of mortar shells were fired from Gaza, most towards IDF forces operating along the border fence.
May 31, 2008
Palestinian terrorists fired five Qassam rockets from the Gaza Strip. No casualties or damage were reported. A sixth Qassam wounded two migrant workers from Thailand, one moderately and the other lightly, on Saturday morning when a Qassam rocket hit the western Negev greenhouse in which they were working.

== June ==
June 2, 2008
Seven Qassam rockets and four mortars hit the western Negev desert. Five people were hurt, including two Bedouin farmhands, a farmer and two Thai migrant workers.
June 5, 2008
Hamas fired three mortar shells from Gaza which landed in the Nirlat paint factory in Kibutz Nir Oz killing Amnon Ronsenberg, a 52-year-old father of three on Thursday. Five additional Israelis were injured. Hamas' Izz al-Din al-Qassam Brigades claimed responsibility for the firing of the mortar.
June 6, 2008
A barrage of Kassam rockets slammed into the western Negev city of Sderot and the surrounding area on Friday afternoon. One of the Kassams exploded near Sapir College, damaging a building on the campus as well as six cars. Nine mortar bombs were fired at the western Negev in several attacks earlier in the day. A building was damaged, but no one was injured.
June 8, 2008
The Al-Quds Brigades fires four rockets toward southern Israel, lightly injuring a Thai foreign worker.
June 10, 2008
Hamas fires 18 mortar shells toward Israel. The mortars, which were fired in two separate salvos, landed in open areas near Nahal Oz. Another four mortar shells and four Qassam rockets were fired later the same day.
June 11, 2008
Factory workers were evacuated from the area after a fire erupted as a result of two mortars from Gaza landing. One man was lightly wounded from shrapnel.
June 12, 2008
Israel's Gaza-vicinity communities were hit with dozens of mortars and rockets, apparently as cover to infiltrate the country with an explosives-laden bulldozer. The attempt was stopped.
A 59-year-old Israeli woman was lightly-to-moderately wounded in the Yad Mordechai area on Thursday afternoon as Palestinian terror groups launched a barrage of mortar shells and Qassam rockets against Israeli communities near the Gaza border. At least 40 mortars and 25 Qassams landed in Israel, primarily in the Hof Ashkelon Regional Council, a number of fires have broken out as a result. A member of Kibbutz Nahal Oz told Ynet that residents have currently been instructed to remain in bomb shelters and fortified rooms. One of the mortars landed in Palestinian territory near the Erez crossing, lightly injuring a Palestinian. Magen David Adom paramedics asked to treat the wounded man but were denied access. In addition, a missile, apparently of a type "Grad" landed near Ashkelon. No injuries were reported but a number of people suffered from shock.
June 16, 2008
A Grad-type rocket fired from the Gaza Strip struck an Ashkelon cemetery leaving one person lightly to moderately wounded. Another rocket exploded inside the city. The victim suffered shrapnel wounds to his neck. Several other people suffered from shock and were treated by emergency medical staff at the scene. Gaza's Hamas rulers took responsibility for the strike.
June 17, 2008
On Tuesday night, terrorists launched up to 10 rockets at Israel. Several fell in open areas around the Israeli border town of Sderot, a military spokeswoman said.
June 18, 2008
More than 40 rockets and mortar shells were launched from Gaza towards Sderot. Several hit the town, causing some damage
June 23, 2008
A single mortar shell was also fired from Gaza late Monday night and landed on the Israeli side of the border fence. No organization claimed responsibility for the attack.
June 24, 2008
Three Qassam rockets fired from Gaza on Tuesday struck the Israeli border town of Sderot and its environs, causing no serious injuries but constituting the first serious breach of a five-day-old truce between Israel and Hamas.

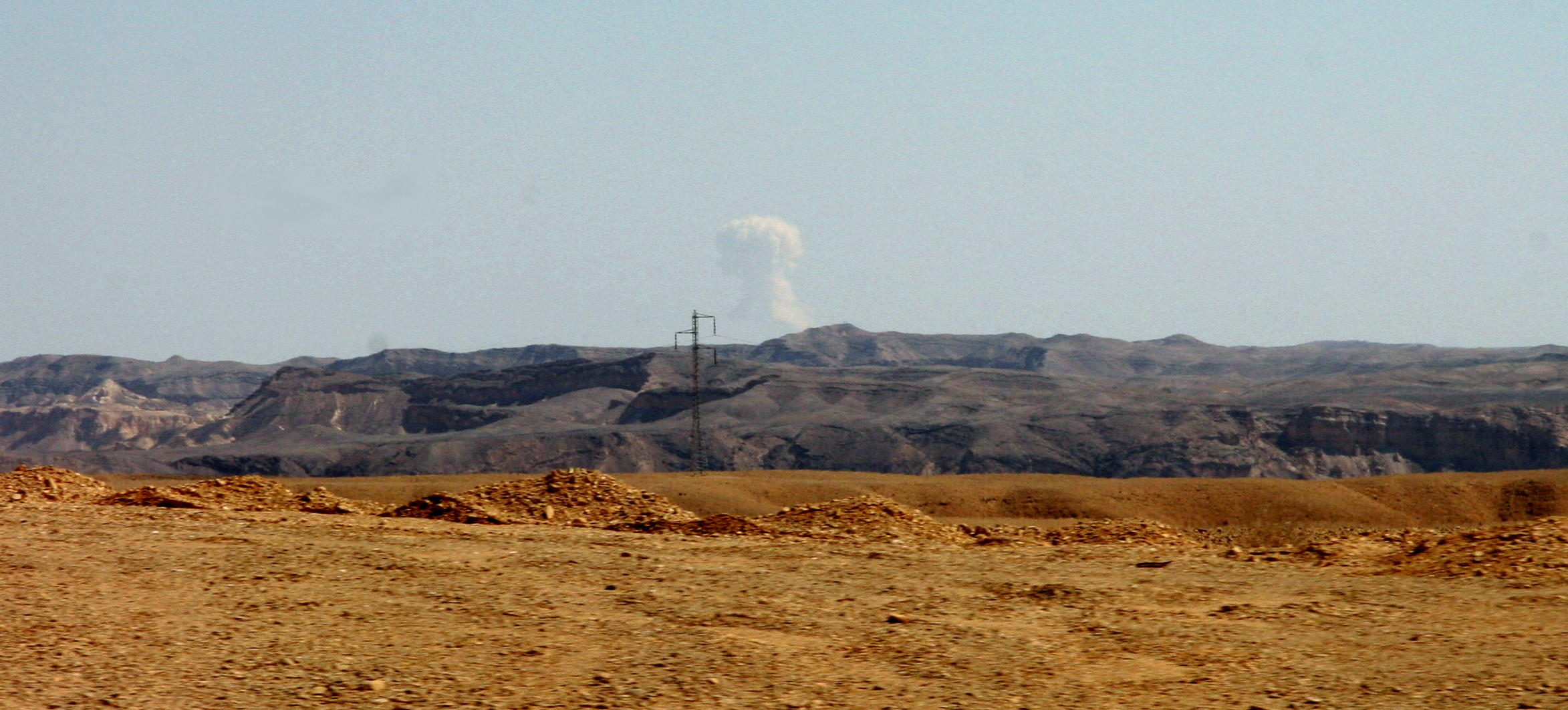
Islamic Jihad rocket exploding in the distance, breaking the 5-day truce

One rocket landed in a backyard garden of a house while another landed in open ground. Two people were treated for shock.
Islamic Jihad claimed responsibility for the attack and said it had been a response to an Israeli military raid in the West Bank city of Nablus at dawn on Tuesday, in which a senior Islamic Jihad operative Tareq Abu Ghali, 24 and another Palestinian university student Iyad Khanfar, 21 were killed. An Israeli Army spokesman said that Abu Ghali had been involved in terrorism and that he was "killed in an exchange of fire." The man killed with him was armed, the spokesman said.
The rocket attack occurred hours after Olmert met President Hosni Mubarak of Egypt in the Red Sea resort of Sharm el Sheik to discuss the next steps in the tenuous Egyptian-mediated truce and the renewal of efforts to resolve the case of Gilad Shalit, an Israeli corporal held by Hamas in Gaza since June 25, 2006.
Israeli Defense Ministry decided that Israel would keep the Gaza border crossings closed Thursday, except for special humanitarian cases, in response to Tuesday's Qassam rocket attacks
June 26, 2008
A rocket hit an open area of the industrial zone outside Sderot. There were no reports of injuries or damage, according to army sources. The Fatah-affiliated Aksa Martyrs Brigades claimed responsibility for the attack. In a text message sent to reporters, it said "the truce must include the West Bank and all sorts of aggression must stop."
On Thursday morning, Hamas accused Israel of violating the terms of the Gaza cease-fire a day after Israeli Defense Ministry decided that Israel would keep the Gaza border crossings closed Thursday, except for special humanitarian cases, in response to Tuesday's Qassam rocket attacks - "If the crossings remain closed, the truce will collapse", Hamas spokesman Sami Abu Zuhri said Thursday morning.
June 27, 2008
Early on Friday, two mortar shells were fired at Israel from the northern Gaza Strip. One landed near Kibbutz Kfar Aza in the Sha'ar Hanegev Regional Council, and the second one hit an open area. There were no reports of injuries or damage in the latest violation of the fragile ceasefire.
Following yesterday's rocket attack by Aksa Martyrs Brigade a spokesman for the Hamas government, Taher al-Nunu, called Fatah's actions "unpatriotic". He said Hamas was considering the possibility of taking action against those perpetrating the attacks against Israel.
Hamas Prime Minister Ismail Haniyeh called Friday on Palestinian factions to adhere to the Gaza Strip lull agreement with Israel. "The factions and the people accepted the lull in order to secure two interests – an end to aggression and the lifting of the siege. Therefore, we hope that everyone honors this national agreement", he said following Friday prayers.
June 28, 2008
Mortar shells were fired at the Karni crossing. No one claims responsibility for the attacks. Israel blocks all shipments into Gaza except fuel, in response to the rocket and mortar attacks.
June 30, 2008
A rocket falls near the town of Mefalsim. Nobody claims responsibility for the attack. In response Israel once again closes the crossings that had previously been reopened on June 29, 2008.

== July ==
July 2, 2008
There were no rocket or mortar attacks so Israel reopens the four Gaza crossings on Wednesday July 2. Since a truce began June 19, Israel has closed the passages a total of six days in retaliation for rocket attacks.
July 3, 2008
A rocket lands in an open area north of Sderot. A previously unknown organization calling itself the "Badr Forces" claims responsibility for the attack. In response Israel temporarily closes the crossings on July 4, 2008.
July 7, 2008
A mortar shell is fired at Israel from Gaza on Monday and lands near the Karni crossing.
July 8, 2008
Two mortar attacks from Gaza were aimed at the Sufa crossing. One fell just inside Gaza and the other at the crossing. Hours later, terrorists fired another shell into Israel, causing no casualties or damage, the Israeli military said. No Palestinian group immediately claimed responsibility.
July 10, 2008
Two Qassam rockets were fired at Israel, but caused no damage, after an unarmed Al-Aqsa Martyrs' Brigades infiltrator was killed at the Kissufim crossing. An Israeli Army spokesman said they fired warning shots and when the man did not stop they killed him. The Al-Aqsa Martyrs' Brigades vowed revenge and claimed responsibility for the rocket attack.
July 12, 2008
A rocket lands in an open area in Sha'ar Hanegev regional council. Nobody claims responsibility for the attack.
July 13, 2008
Two mortar shells are misfired and they land on the Gaza side of the border security fence in the Nahal Oz region. Nobody claims responsibility for the attack. Israel responds by only closing the Nahal Oz and Sufa crossings.
July 15, 2008
A mortar hit is identified.
July 25, 2008
A rocket misfires and lands in Gaza near the Kissufim crossing.
July 29, 2008
Another rocket is launched from Gaza and mistakenly lands in Gaza.
July 31, 2008
Again, a rocket misfires and lands in Gaza.

== August ==
August 1-31st
In the month of August 7 rockets and 12 mortars were fired from Gaza into Israel.

== September ==
September 1-30th
The month of September represented a considerable lull in the number of rocket and mortar attacks. In this month, 3 rockets and 2 mortars were fired from Gaza into Israel. They caused no injuries or deaths.

== October ==
October 11
A single rocket was launched from Gaza into Israel resulting in no injuries or deaths.

== November ==
November 4
Hamas fires 30 Qassam rockets at Israel after an Israeli operation on 4 November to close a 250 meter cross-border abduction tunnel in Gaza. During this operation, 7 Hamas militants were killed.
November 6-12th
Given the increase in cross-border fire, the truce agreed to five months ago is starting to flounder. Between November 5th and November 12th, 22 rockets and 9 mortars were fired into Israel.
November 12–19
In this week 62 rockets and 26 mortars were fired from Gaza into Israel. The results of these attacks were that 16 people were wounded, 13 from shock and 3 from light wounds.
November 21
A rocket hit the Ashkelon industrial area.
November 22–23
Four Qassam rockets were fired from Gaza into Israel over the weekend.
November 24–25
Two Qassam rockets landed in Israel.
November 26–27
Four Qassam rockets landed in the western Negev, one damaging a house on a kibbutz.

== December ==
December 3
At least four Qassam rockets and 15 mortar rounds were fired from the Gaza Strip at the western Negev. Islamic Jihad's Al-Quds Brigades claimed responsibility. One mortar attack damaged an Israeli power cable being used to transfer electricity to the Hamas-controlled Gaza Strip.
December 6–7
At least 20 Qassam rockets and mortar shells fired from the Gaza Strip hit the western Negev over the weekend. One Qassam landed near a Sderot school.
December 12
Two rockets launched from the Gaza Strip hit open space in Israel a week before a truce is set to expire. The Qassam rockets launched Friday landed in open areas and caused no damage.
December 16
At least six Qassam rockets and a mortar shell hit Israel hours after Israeli troops killed an Islamic Jihad commander in the West Bank. One of the rockets fired landed in the soccer field of Sderot's Sapir College. Several people were treated for shock.
December 17
A Qassam rocket struck the parking lot of a shopping center in Sderot, injuring three Israelis. At least 18 rockets and 6 mortar shells were fired this day on southern Israel, 48 hours before the truce between Israel and the Hamas expired.
December 18
Hamas declares the end of the 6 Month Truce with Israel. Three rockets are fired at Israel by the Al-Quds Brigades.
December 21
At least 50 rockets and mortars struck southern Israel since a cease-fire with Hamas ended on December 19. Rockets landed in Ashkelon's industrial zone, near an elementary school, a youth cultural center in the western Negev and a home in Sderot. A foreign worker was injured. In response, Israeli forces struck at least two rocket launchers in Gaza.
December 22
Three Qassam rockets were fired at Israel on Monday afternoon and evening, while Hamas had mostly stopped launching rockets at Israel for 24 hours at the request of Egypt.
December 23
At least five Qassam rockets fired from the Gaza Strip struck the western Negev.
December 24
More than 60 Qassam rockets and dozens of mortar shells struck homes, factories and a playground in southern Israel. Two longer ranged Grad-type missiles struck a public area in northern Ashkelon. Homes in Kibbutz Shaar Hanegev and Sdot Negev suffered serious damage from direct hits. A rocket also struck next to a playground in Netivot. One factory in the western Negev was hit twice. Several people in those areas were treated for shock.
Two Palestinians were hurt when a rocket that did not clear the security fence at the border landed on a home in a northern Gaza town.
December 26
A dozen rockets and mortar bombs were fired from Gaza into Israel, one accidentally falling short and striking a northern Gaza house and killing two Palestinian sisters, aged five and twelve, while wounding a third
December 27–31
(See Gaza War (2008–09)#Israel.)

== See also ==
- Casualties in the Israeli–Palestinian conflict
- Background to the Gaza war 2008-2009
