= Sana Solh =

Lebanese human rights activist (1939–2019)

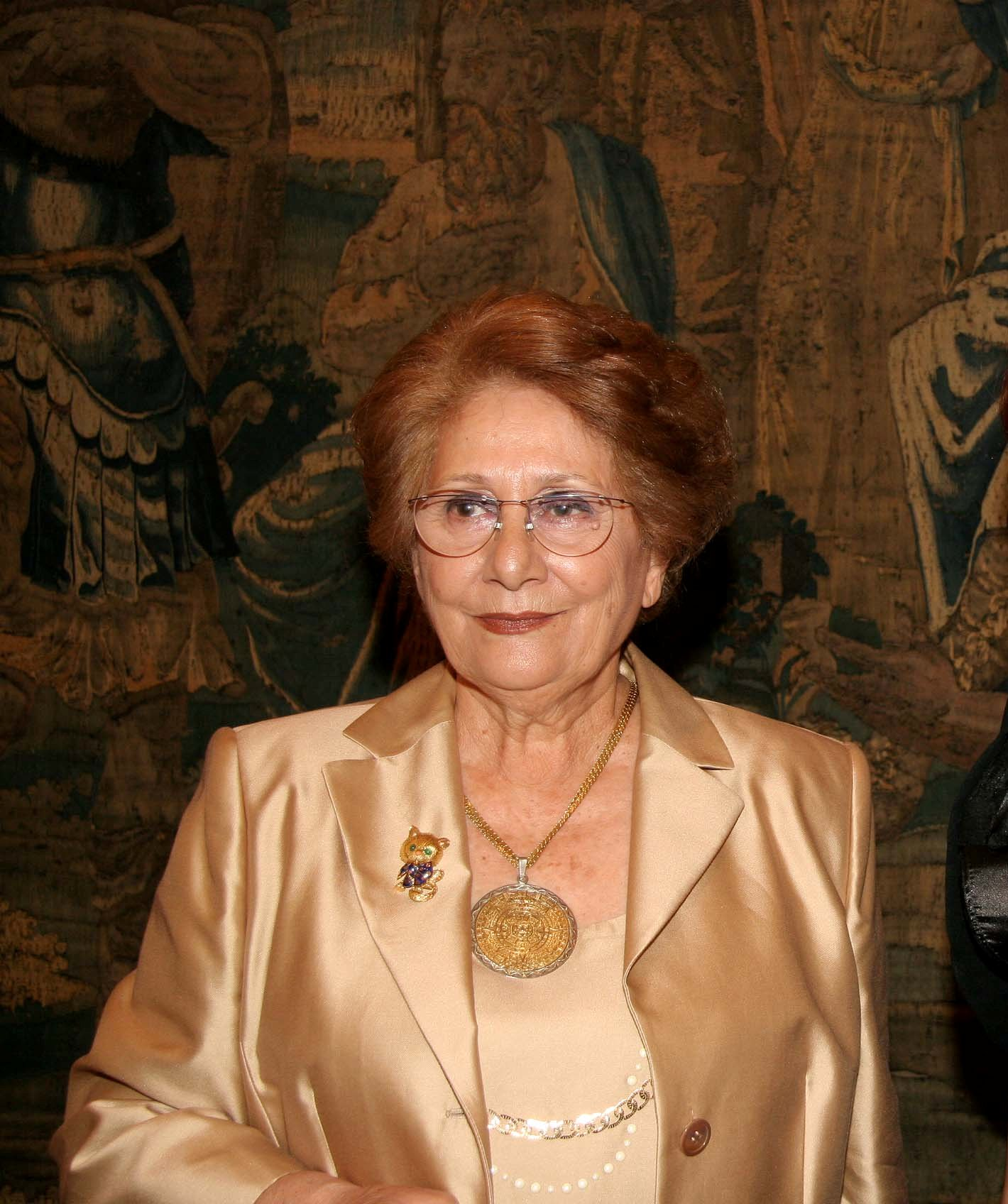
- Solh in 2009
- Born: 19 September 1939
- Died: 24 September 2019 (aged 80)
- Education: Lebanese American University
- Occupations: Former President of Make Mothers Matter - Lebanon; Former Secretary General of Amnesty International – Lebanon; Former Vice President of the Lebanese Council of Women; Former President of the Association of Parents of Children with Disabilities, Lebanon; Former Vice President of Al Amal Institute for the Disabled, Lebanon
- Children: Assaad W. Razzouk
- Parents: Waheed el Solh (father); Mounira Solh (mother)

Sana Solh (19 September 1939 – 24 September 2019) was a Lebanese human rights activist who advocated for the respect and equal rights of women, children and persons with disabilities through social and political change. She was one of the main female leaders of the civil rights movements in Lebanon, actively working, lobbying and leading demonstrations to fight for the right of women to grant their nationality to their children, ask for laws to guarantee quotas for women's participation in politics, or raise funds for the many institutions and associations where she was an active member.

== Life and work ==
Solh hails from a prominent family which gave Lebanon four prime ministers, Riad Solh, Sami Solh, Takieddine Solh and Rachid Solh. She is the daughter of Wahid Solh, who was assassinated for political reasons during the 1958 civil war in Lebanon. Her mother is Mounira Solh who was the first woman in Lebanon and probably in the Arab world to run for a seat in the Parliament of Lebanon and one of the main female leaders of the demonstrations that led to her country's independence in 1943.

Early on, Solh was an active member of Al Amal Institute for the Disable, Broumana Lebanon. Al Amal was founded in 1959 by her mother Mounira Solh and was the first center of its kind in the Middle East. Solh helped managing and raising funds for the institute for many decades. She also took the leadership of the Association of Parents of Children with Disabilities, Lebanon, which was also established by her mother in 1984.

Later on in life, Solh expanded the scope of her activism becoming the vice-president of the Lebanese Council of Women, an umbrella organization for more than 150 associations across the country, and was the secretary general of Amnesty International in Lebanon. She was the president of the Lebanese chapter of Make Mothers Matter, which advocates for peace. At the helm of MMM-Lebanon, she led a series of workshops across Lebanese regions to help women overcome family conflicts and spread peace in their community. She was a member of many other advocacy associations, including the American University of Beirut's Women's League, the International Women's Democratic Union, the Union For Children's Rights in Lebanon, the National Union of Associations of Parents and Institutions for People with Intellectual Disabilities in Lebanon, and a founding committee member of Civic Organization for Citizen Safety (Safe Citizen) in Lebanon. Solh was also a member of the alumni association of the Lebanese American University (LAU)

== Family ==
Solh had three children from her first husband Wajdi Assaad Razzouk: Assaad, Nadim and Nayla Razzouk, and two from her second marriage to Joseph Boutros Raad: Nael and Hala Raad. She had seven grandchildren: Marek, Sari, Karim and Nour Razzouk, Peter Joseph Raad, and Sofia and Karl Georges.

== Education ==
She earned a diploma in business management from the Beirut University College (current Lebanese American University), a diploma in sociology from Portsmouth College of Technology in the U.K, and a diploma in translation from the Ecole Hermes de Lausanne, Switzerland. She studied at the Brummana High School, the American School for Girls, and the Lycee de jeunes filles in Beirut.

== Conferences ==
In her struggle to advance the rights of women, children and people with disability, Solh has represented Lebanon at various international conferences around the world.

- International Council of Women:

Bangkok, Thailand, 17 – 19 November 2014

Seoul, South Korea, 17 – 22 September 2012

Barcelona, Spain, June 2012

Jakarta, Indonesia, April 2008

Rabat, Morocco, March 2005

- International Women's Democratic Union

Havana, Cuba, 28 November - 1 December 2015 Brasilia, Brazil, 8 – 12 April 2012; Caracas, Venezuela

- Rehabilitation International

Nairobi, Kenya, September 1992 Lisbon, Portugal, June 1984 Dublin, Ireland, 1968

- Economic Business Women Forum

Manama, Bahrain, November 2009

- General Arab Women Federation

Algiers, Algeria, 2006

- Conference on Arab Women and Quotas

Beirut, Lebanon, 1998
