= Tahdiya =

Arabic-language term applied to the Israel–Hamas conflict

Tahdiya is Arabic (تهدئة) for "calming" or "quieting".

It is an Islamic legal concept that refers to the temporary pacification of conflict and is sometimes translated as "temporary ceasefire". However, unlike a more permanent truce, it is nonbinding and may be broken at any time and without delay by Muslims.

The term has been applied to a proposed temporary lull between the Israeli forces and the Palestinian National Authority branch of the Muslim Brotherhood Hamas, beginning early in 2004 following the unsuccessful discussions to sign a hudna, or temporary armistice. While hudna is a term for temporary armistice, it should not be confused with tahdiya, which stands for calming down on hostilities but not a complete stop to them.

== See also ==
- Aman (Islam) or amān, assurance of security or clemency granted to enemies who seek protection
- Futuwwa, concept of moral behavior similar to Western chivalry in the medieval Arab and Muslim world
- Hudna, truce or armistice in Islam
- List of Islamic terms in Arabic
- Sulh, Arabic word meaning "resolution" or "fixing" generally, frequently used in the context of social problems
