= Hudna =

Arabic-language term for a truce or armistice

A hudna (from the Arabic هدنة meaning "calm" or "quiet") is a truce or armistice. It is sometimes translated as "cease-fire". In his medieval dictionary of classical Arabic, the Lisan al-Arab, Ibn Manzur defined it as:

"hadana: he grew quiet. hadina: he quieted (transitive or intransitive). haadana: he made peace with. The noun from each of these is hudna."

A famous early hudna was the Treaty of Hudaybiyyah between Muhammad and the Quraysh tribe.

== Hudna in the Israeli–Palestinian conflict ==
In English, the term is most frequently used in reference to a ceasefire agreement in the Israeli–Palestinian conflict, particularly one that would involve organizations such as Hamas. The concept was also proposed to reduce violence in the conflict between Israel and the Palestinians by a Queen's University Belfast Professor in the period of 1999–2003 as a result of protracted negotiations with the Hamas leadership in the Gaza Strip, West Bank and abroad in countries like Lebanon and Syria. Some others claim that Israeli businessman Eyal Erlich in 2001, after seeing a hudna being declared in order to calm a feud in Jordan (cf. Haaretz, January 2, 2002); introduced the idea, unsuccessfully, that Israel should suggest a mutual hudna as a prelude to a more lasting peace.

Despite the Israeli government's rejection of the idea, in summer 2003—following many years of negotiation and facilitation from European advisors and diplomats along with pressure from Abu Mazen and Egypt—Hamas and Islamic Jihad unilaterally declared a 45-day ceasefire, or hudna. Its proponents commonly argued that such a cease-fire would allow for important violence reduction and act as a confidence-building measure to make further conflict resolution and peace negotiations possible; its opponents commonly argued that it would be a mere tactical maneuver enabling Palestinian groups to re-group and muster their strength in preparation for further attacks on Israelis, or Israel to continue expanding settlements, blockading Palestinian towns, and arresting members of such groups. The hudna started on June 29, 2003.

In January 2004, senior Hamas leader Abdel Aziz al-Rantissi offered a 10-year hudna in return for complete withdrawal from all territories captured in the Six-Day War, the establishment of a Palestinian state in the West Bank and Gaza, and the "right of return" for all Palestinian refugees. Rantissi gave interviews with European reporters and said the hudna was limited to ten years and represented a decision by the movement because it was "difficult to liberate all our land at this stage; the hudna would however not signal a recognition of the state of Israel."

== See also ==
- Aman (Islam) or amān, assurance of security or clemency granted to enemies who seek protection
- History of Islam
- List of Islamic terms in Arabic
- Second Intifada or Al-Aqsa Intifada (2000–2005), Palestinian uprising; its resolution included hudnas between Palestinian factions and with Israel
- Sulh, Arabic word meaning "resolution" or "fixing" generally, frequently used in the context of social problems
- Tahdia, Arabic for "calming" or "quieting"; stands for calming down on hostilities but not a complete stop to them
