= Roula Khalaf =

British-Lebanese journalist (born 1965)

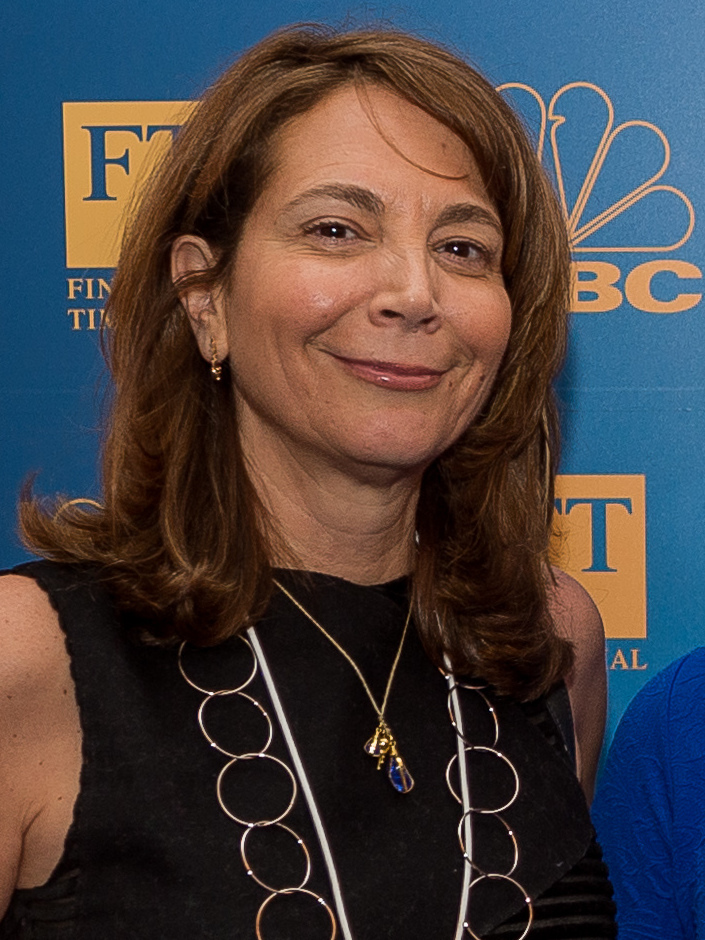
- Khalaf in 2018
- Born: 1965 (age 60–61); Beirut, Lebanon
- Education: Syracuse University (BA); Columbia University (MIA)
- Occupations: Journalist and editor
- Title: Editor, Financial Times
- Term: 2020–
- Predecessor: Lionel Barber
- Spouse: Assaad W. Razzouk
- Children: 2

Roula Khalaf (Arabic: رولا خلف; born 1965) is a British–Lebanese journalist who is the editor of the Financial Times, having been its deputy editor and foreign editor. She succeeded Lionel Barber as editor on 20 January 2020.

== Early life ==
Khalaf was born in 1965 in Beirut, Lebanon, and grew up there during the civil war. She earned a bachelor's degree from the S. I. Newhouse School of Public Communications at Syracuse University, and a master's degree in international affairs from Columbia University in New York City.

== Career ==
Khalaf began her career as a staff writer for Forbes magazine in New York, and worked for the magazine for about four years.

She has worked for the FT since 1995, first as North Africa correspondent, then Middle East correspondent, Middle East editor and as foreign editor. In 2016, she was promoted to be deputy editor of the Financial Times. In addition to her deputy editor responsibilities, she wrote and commented regularly on world affairs, Middle East politics and business.

Following the announcement that Lionel Barber would step down as editor of the paper in January 2020, it was announced that Khalaf would succeed him in that post. She is the first female editor in the 131-year history of the Financial Times. On 7 October 2022, Khalaf published an exclusive interview she secured as the FT editor with the Tesla CEO Elon Musk, in which he explained his future plans for Twitter, Tesla and his SpaceX project.

In May 2023, The New York Times reported that Khalaf prevented the publishing of an FT article covering sexual misconduct allegations against Nick Cohen.

== Awards ==
In 2009, Khalaf won the Peace through Media Award of the International Media Awards "in recognition of her high standards of reporting and the quality of her news analysis". In 2011, she was shortlisted for the Foreign Reporter of the Year category of the Press Awards. In 2012, she was shortlisted for the One World Media Awards for her article, The Muslim Sisterhood.

In 2013, she received, with her Financial Times colleagues Abigail Fielding-Smith, Camilla Hall and Simeon Kerr, the Foreign Press Association media award Print and Web Feature Story of the Year for Qatar: From Emirate to Empire.

== In popular culture ==
Khalaf is quoted in Jordan Belfort's 2007 memoir The Wolf of Wall Street; "The press onslaught had started in 1991, when an insolent reporter from Forbes magazine, Roula Khalaf, coined me as a twisted version of Robin Hood, who robs from the rich and gives to himself and his merry band of brokers. She deserved an A for cleverness, of course."

== Personal life ==
She is married to the Lebanese businessman Assaad W. Razzouk. They have two sons. Her brother is Michel A. Khalaf, president and CEO of MetLife.

Media offices
| Preceded by Lionel Barber | Editor of the Financial Times; 2020–present | Incumbent |
