= Waheed el Solh =

Lebanese politician

Wahid Solh وحيد الصلح
- Born: 1901; Saida, Lebanon
- Died: 13 October 1958 (aged 56–57); Achrafieh, Beirut, Lebanon
- Education: American University of Beirut
- Occupation: Lebanese politician
- Spouse: Mounira Solh
- Children: Sana Solh

Waheed el Solh or Wahid Solh (in Arabic وحيد الصلح, born in Saida, Ottoman Empire 1901 – died in Beirut, 13 October 1958) was a Lebanese politician and a close aide to his uncle, former prime minister Sami Solh. At the time of his death, he was a Planning Ministry official.

Wahid Solh was born in 1901 in Saida, Lebanon. He was a relative of former Lebanese prime ministers Riad Solh, Sami Solh, Takieddine Solh and Rachid Solh. He was married to Mounira Solh, a pioneer advocate for the rights of women and people with disabilities in Lebanon. They had five children: Samir, Najla, Salim, Sana and Nassib.

He was assassinated for political reasons on October 13, 1958, during the civil war in Lebanon
