= Istijarah =

Islamic term for providing asylum

Istijarah (Arabic: إستجارة, Istijārah) is an Islamic term for asylum, accepting a person at risk as a member of own tribe.

== Definition ==
A system of clan protection existed in Pre-Islamic Arabia, and people without a clan would stand without protection. Such a person could request for Istijarah (asylum) from a person already having a clan association in order to receive protection from that person. This was a common practice in Arabia, this was used by some Muslims who returned from the first Migration to Abyssinia, and Muhammad himself requested Istijarah from Mut'im ibn Adi after his return to Mecca from the visit to Ta'if. The term is also used in the Qur'an.
