= Assaad W. Razzouk =

Lebanese-British clean energy entrepreneur, investor and art gallery owner (born 1964)

Assaad Wajdi Razzouk
- Born: November 28, 1964 (age 61); Beirut, Lebanon
- Education: Syracuse University; Columbia University
- Occupation: CEO of Gurin Energy
- Spouse: Roula Khalaf
- Mother: Sana Solh

Assaad Wajdi Razzouk (born in 1964 in Beirut, Lebanon) is a Lebanese-British clean-energy entrepreneur, author, podcaster and commentator.

== Biography ==
From 1993 to 2002, Razzouk was an investment banker at Nomura International plc in London, where he was successively Head of the Middle East Group (1993–1997), Head of Corporate Finance – Emerging Markets (1997–1999), Head of Corporate Finance – Financial Institutions, Communications and Technology (1999–2001) and Deputy Head, Global Corporate Finance (2001–2002).

In 2005 Razzouk co-founded Sindicatum Renewable Energy, of which he was chairman and chief executive officer. Sindicatum (Singapore) is a developer, owner and operator of clean energy projects in Asia.

In 2021 Razzouk co-founded Gurīn Energy, of which he is chief executive officer. Gurīn Energy is a renewable energy development platform headquartered in Singapore which focuses on greenfield renewable projects across Asia.

His début book Saving the Planet Without the Bullshit was published in 2022 by Atlantic Books. Razzouk is also the host of The Angry Clean Energy Guy podcast.

Razzouk founded Southeast Asia's first Middle Eastern contemporary art gallery, Sana Gallery in Singapore.

== Education ==
Razzouk is a graduate of Syracuse University (summa cum laude) and holds an MBA from Columbia University in New York and a Doctor of Philosophy (Ph.D.) Honoris Causa in Climate Change, Sustainable Development and International Cooperation from Teri University in India.

== Memberships ==
Razzouk is a board member of ClientEarth, an environmental group using the law to protect Earth and its inhabitants; a board member of EB Impact, a Singapore-based non-profit organization that provides trainings and programs to Asia Pacific's underserved communities; and is affiliated with Washington, D.C.'s Middle East Institute as an Expert at the Middle East – Asia Project. He also serves on the advisory board of media group Eco-Business and on the International Council of the National University of Singapore Yong Loo Lin School of Medicine.

== Bibliography ==
- Saving the Planet Without the Bullshit (2022, Atlantic Books, ISBN 9781838954628)

== Awards ==
Razzouk won the Association for Sustainable & Responsible Investment in Asia (ASrIA)s "Most Progressive Corporate Leader" award in 2011. Razzouk was also named among the Top 50 Low-Carbon Pioneers by CNBC Business in June 2007 and among the Top 600 Most Powerful People in Finance by Global Finance in September 1998. Razzouk was chosen among the worlds 20 most influential CEOs on Twitter by INSEAD in May 2016, a list also including leaders such as Tim Cook, Bill Gates, Elon Musk and Richard Branson.

Under Razzouk's leadership, Sindicatum Sustainable Resources Group won the 2013 Commodity Business Awards for Excellence in Emission Markets and a Special Commendation for Excellence in Market Policy and Advisory. In 2012, Sindicatum won the Energy Institute ‘Energy Excellence' Award for its Duerping Project in China. Sindicatum's Duerping Project was designed to optimise energy recovery from waste gas extracted from a coal mine that was previously vented to the atmosphere. Sindicatum Sustainable Resources Group also won the 2012 Commodity Business Award for Excellence in Renewable Energy Markets, as well as special commendations for Excellence in Emission Markets and Excellence in Policy and Advisory.

In 2011, Sindicatum Sustainable Resources Group won the Commodity Business Award for Excellence in Renewable Energy Markets, as well as a Special Commendation in the Commodity Market Policy & Advisory category, and two Green Business Awards, for excellence in the Renewable Energy and Carbon Reduction categories.

== Personal life ==
He is married to the British-Lebanese journalist Roula Khalaf.
