= Gordon Newton =

English journalist and editor

Sir Gordon Newton
- Born: Leslie Gordon Newton; 16 September 1907; Muswell Hill, Middlesex, England
- Died: 31 August 1998 (aged 90); Henley-on-Thames, Oxfordshire, England
- Education: Sidney Sussex College, Cambridge
- Occupation: Editor
- Spouse: Peggy Ellen Warren (m. 1935; died 1995)
- Children: 1

Sir Leslie Gordon Newton (16 September 1907 – 31 August 1998) was an English journalist and editor of the Financial Times for 22 years, from 1950 until 1972. He is generally considered to be one of the most successful British newspaper editors of the post-Second World War era.

== Early years ==
Newton was the second son of John Newton, a glass merchant, and his wife Edith Sara, née Goode. He attended Blundell's School and Sidney Sussex College, Cambridge, where he read economics. After graduating in 1929, he joined the family glass business, only to see it collapse the following year. At his father's suggestion, Newton then purchased a struggling mirror-making firm which he sold in 1933 for a profit, only to lose the money in a company that manufactured automobile parts when his business partner ran off with the firm's money.

== Journalism career ==
Desperately looking for work, in 1935 Newton received a position as a cuttings clerk with the Financial News. Soon he moved into a position as a journalist and enjoyed a series of promotions, becoming the news editor in 1939. He resigned his position not long after his appointment to join the Honourable Artillery Company, in which he served throughout the war despite an offer of a position in military intelligence. After the war Newton returned to the Financial News, which had just been acquired by Brendan Bracken. The new owner merged it with the Financial Times, employing Newton as the paper's features editor and leader writer. During this period, Newton wrote the Lex column for a year, and also travelled to Washington, D.C. to report on negotiations over the devaluation of the pound.

=== Editorship of the Financial Times ===
When the editor of the Financial Times, Hargreaves Parkinson, retired due to a terminal illness in 1950, Bracken passed over the expected successor, Harold Wincott in favour of Newton. The choice proved a great success. Granted a free hand by the paper's owners, he strengthened its coverage of financial, business, and political news while broadening it to include areas such as the arts. Eschewing journalists with previous experience in the profession, he hired graduates straight from the universities of Oxford and Cambridge, giving a start to the careers of writers such as Patrick Hutber (of Hutber's law), William Rees-Mogg, Christopher Tugendhat and Nigel Lawson.

Newton's decisions contributed to the success of the newspaper. Sales trebled during his years as editor, as Newton transformed the Financial Times from a trade publication into an internationally respected newspaper. In 1958, he hired Sheila Black, a former actor and FT’s first female journalist, who introduced the How to Spend It consumer goods feature in 1967, with whom he also had a long-running extramarital affair. Newton received a knighthood in 1967, and served as a director of the paper between 1967 and 1972.

== Later years ==
Newton voluntarily stepped down from his responsibilities with the Financial Times in 1972 after reaching the age of 65. He took up a chairmanship of a financial company that collapsed amidst the secondary banking crisis of 1973–1975, but subsequently served with greater success on other boards. He lived quietly in Henley-on-Thames, where he indulged his passion for fly fishing, until his death from cerebrovascular disease in 1998.

Media offices
Preceded by Hargreaves Parkinson	Editor of The Financial Times; 1950-1972	Succeeded by Fredy Fisher
