= Pensions Expert =

British magazine

- Editor: Nick Reeve
- Categories: Business Publication
- Frequency: Weekdays
- Total circulation: 6,500
- First issue: January, 1997
- Company: DG Publishing
- Country: United Kingdom
- Language: English
- Website: pensions-expert.com
- ISSN: 1366-8765

Pensions Expert is a specialist publication for the UK pension and investment sector. Providing news analysis, case studies and informed comment. Owned by DG Publishing Ltd, a specialist UK pension conferencing and publication management company. It was established in January 1997.

== History ==
Pensions Expert was originally launched by FT Magazines as Pensions Week in January 1997. Its launch editor was Andrew Michael, former editor of headlinemoney. It was the first news-led title to cover the UK pensions industry.

In 2008, it became part of the Financial Publishing division of the Financial Times, which includes other financial publications such as The Banker, Investors Chronicle, Money Management and fDi Magazine.

The FT re-launched Pensions Week as Pensions Expert in January 2014 to reflect its web-first editorial approach.

In April 2023, the Pensions Expert title was acquired by DG Publishing.

== Content ==
Pensions Expert publishes articles on defined benefit and defined contribution pension schemes, investments, derisking, auto-enrolment and legal and regulatory developments. It tailors its coverage for trustee boards and scheme management teams and focuses on news about what individual pension schemes are doing to provide retirement income for their members. Its tagline is "Informing scheme decisions".

== PIPA Awards ==
Each year, Pensions Expert host the Pension and Investment Provider Awards for providers of products and services to UK workplace pension schemes. Criteria used to adjudicate the awards are performance, innovation and service standards. The awards have been running since 1999.
