= Tom Gross =

British journalist and human rights activist

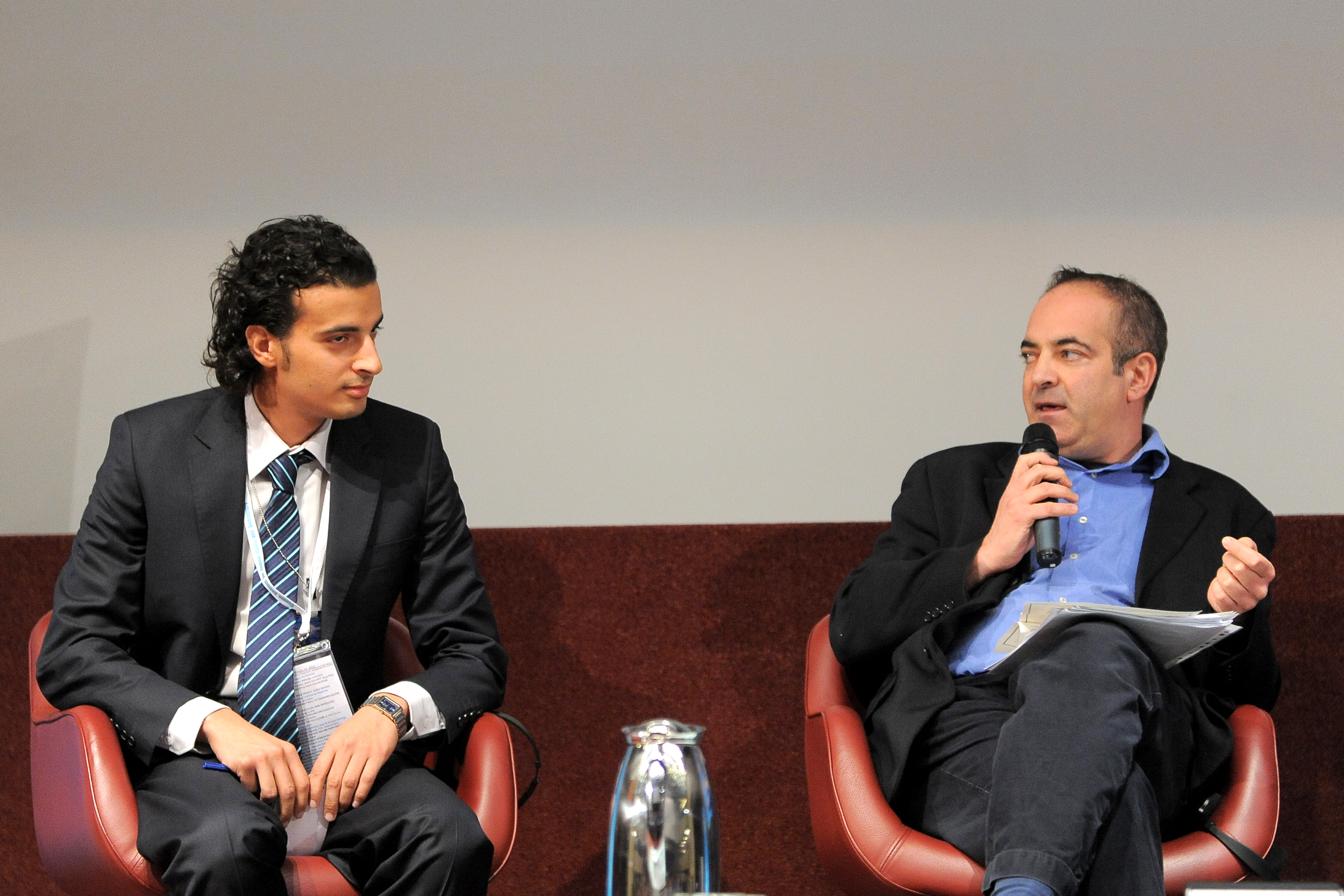
- Tom Gross (right) interviews Egyptian dissident and former political prisoner Maikel Nabil at the 2012 Geneva Summit for Human Rights and Democracy
- Born: London, England, United Kingdom
- Education: Wadham College, Oxford University
- Occupations: Journalist and commentator
- Parents: John Gross; Miriam Gross
- Relatives: Kurt May (grandfather); Susanna Gross (sister); Sonia Orwell (godmother); John Preston (brother-in-law); Geoffrey Owen (stepfather)
- Writing career
- Language: English

Tom Gross is a British-born journalist, international affairs commentator, and human rights campaigner specializing in the Middle East. Gross was formerly a foreign correspondent for the London Sunday Telegraph and New York Daily News.

He now works as an opinion journalist and has written for both Arab and Israeli newspapers, as well as European and American ones, both liberal and conservative. He also appears as a commentator on the BBC in English, BBC Arabic, and various Middle Eastern and other networks.

His politics are mixed. The German newspaper Die Welt described Gross as "A liberal in the fight against left-wing liberal hypocrisy". In a profile of Gross in the Saudi-owned pan-Arab newspaper Asharq Al-Awsat in 2019, it was noted that he started as a non-political entertainment and feature journalist before becoming a political commentator.

Long involved in discreet behind-the-scenes bridge-building meetings between officials and activists from Israel and nations throughout the Arab world, Gross was the first journalist sympathetic to Israel to be favorably profiled in a Saudi newspaper, at a time when Saudi outreach to Israel was in its infancy.

Gross has also been interviewed by Israeli newspapers including Haaretz and by Iranian opposition media. His call for good relations between Israelis, Jews and (anti-regime) Iranians was viewed on Instagram in Iran more than 2.4 million times the day after the Iranian regime fired 350 missiles and drones at Israel in April 2024.

In 2014, former Pentagon official Michael Rubin wrote that "Tom Gross is probably Europe’s leading observer of the Middle East". Gross was similarly described in Toronto's National Post in April 2019.

== Education and family ==
Gross was educated at Wadham College at Oxford University, where he studied Philosophy, Politics and Economics (PPE). His father, John Gross, was a distinguished author and critic, and his mother, Miriam Gross, and sister, Susanna Gross, are literary editors. His step-father Sir Geoffrey Owen was editor of the Financial Times. His brother-in-law is the novelist and author John Preston. His uncle was Tony Gross, a pioneering fashion optician. He has a daughter, Sivan.

Gross's maternal grandfather, Kurt May, was a German-Jewish lawyer who fled Nazi persecution to Jerusalem, where Gross's mother was born. May later led the legal battle of The United Restitution Organization, which fought to attain restitution from German companies for persecuted Jews, Roma and others, after World War II. May was also a senior advisor to the U.S. chief prosecutor at the Nuremberg war crime trials. Gross's maternal grandmother, Vera Feinberg, also escaped Nazi Germany for pre-state Israel, but her parents were deported to Theresienstadt (Terezin) concentration camp and later to Treblinka where they were gassed to death upon arrival.

Gross has also cited the strong influence during his childhood of his godmother, Sonia Orwell, widow of the writer George Orwell and the model for Orwell's heroine Julia in the novel Nineteen Eighty-Four. Gross wrote in The Spectator magazine that Sonia had no children of her own, and "she became almost like a second mother to me".

Gross discussed his upbringing growing up surrounded by cultural and literary luminaries in London and New York, as well as his later career and work with Roma and human rights, in an interview in 2020.

== Journalistic career ==
Gross was formerly the Jerusalem correspondent for the London Sunday Telegraph and for the New York Daily News. He has been a contributor to The Wall Street Journal, Weekly Standard, National Review and Huffington Post in the United States, to The National Post in Canada, to The Australian in Australia, for the Saudi paper Asharq Al-Awsat and to The Times of India.

In Britain, he has written for The Guardian, Daily Telegraph, Spectator, Standpoint, Evening Standard, and other publications; in Israel, for Haaretz, Maariv and The Jerusalem Post; in Germany for Die Welt; and in Iran, for a number of opposition websites.

In a series titled “Conversations with friends about their lives,” Gross has interviewed pianist Evgeny Kissin, lawyer Alan Dershowitz, filmmaker Hossein Amini, New York Times columnist Bret Stephens, Guardian columnist Jonathan Freedland, writers David Pryce-Jones, John O'Sullivan, Nazi-hunter Efraim Zuroff and others.

== Human rights activism ==
He has criticized the UN for not doing more to promote freedom in countries such as North Korea and Mauritania. He has also conducted various on stage interviews, including with a French hostage kidnapped by Islamic State in Syria, a Nigerian schoolgirl kidnapped by Boko Haram in Nigeria, and with the wife of the imprisoned Saudi liberal blogger and political prisoner Raif Badawi.

Gross has advocated for the rights of the Roma, Domari, Kurdish, Yazidi and Rohingya minorities, and disabled people.

== Media criticism ==
Much of his work has concerned the way the international media covers the Middle East. He has been cited on the subject in papers such as The New York Times and interviewed in Haaretz and on television about this. He has been critical of the BBC, arguing that their Middle East coverage is often slanted against Israel, and has subjected the coverage of Reuters, The Guardian and CNN and what he termed the "cult of Rachel Corrie” to scrutiny.

He has also been critical of The New York Times, both for their general foreign coverage, and historically for what he terms their "lamentable record of not covering the Holocaust."

== Israel-Palestine ==
Gross has consistently supported the creation of an independent Palestinian Arab state alongside Israel. Gross, however, has stated that "to be viable and successful it is not only a question of what Israel will give the Palestinians, but of the Palestinians themselves engaging in good governance." He warned that "there is no point in creating a new Palestinian state if it will primarily be used as a launching ground for armed attacks on Israel, which would be likely to in turn only lead to a much bloodier war between Israelis and Palestinians than anything we have witnessed in the past."

Gross has also written about the Jews of the Arab world, specifically about the forced removal of Jews from Arab countries.

== Prague ==
Gross has also lived and worked in Prague, where he served as correspondent (covering the Czech Republic, Slovakia, and Albania) for the (London) Daily Telegraph and Sunday Telegraph. He helped launch the Czech edition of Elle magazine, the first international glossy magazine in post-communist central and eastern Europe. In addition, he wrote a regular op-ed column for The Prague Post and op-eds for the Czech daily Lidové Noviny. He has acted as a consultant to the Prague Jewish museum. In The Guardian Gross has been critical of the fact that Prague still has no central state-funded Holocaust memorial, unlike most other European capital cities from which Jews were deported.

== Work on Roma ==
Tom Gross has also campaigned on behalf of the Romani people. "This is one of the most painful and disturbing problems in Europe today, though it is often neglected or misreported by the mainstream media", he wrote.

For two years, based in Prague, he served as a special advisor to the United Nations High Commissioner for Refugees (UNHCR) on the plight of Czech Roma, mainly relating to citizenship issues arising as a result of the breakup of Czechoslovakia. He criticized the internationally renowned liberal icon and playwright Václav Havel, in columns in The Spectator and The Prague Post, for not doing enough to help Roma while he served as Czech president.

== Television and radio ==
Tom Gross has worked on a number of television programs and documentary films, including BBC TV specials on Czech Roma, and on Sudeten Germans. On the Middle East, he has appeared as a commentator on BBC World news, CNN, Fox News, and NPR. He has been interviewed on international politics on Sky News Arabia, i24 News, Russia Today, TRT World Turkey, Israel Channel 13 and BBC Arabic.

== Books ==
Gross is co-author of Out of Tune: David Helfgott and the Myth of Shine (Warner Books, New York, 1998) and of The Time Out Guide to Prague (Penguin Books, London, 1995). Out of Tune was named the most important biography of a troubled genius by The Huffington Post in April 2011.

== Public service ==
Gross is a voluntary director of the Raif Badawi Foundation named after the imprisoned Saudi liberal dissident, and a member of the International Advisory Board of NGO Monitor, of Mideast Dig and of Keren Malki, a charity helping special needs children in Israel. He is a founding signatory to The Henry Jackson Society's Statement of Principles in London.
