= FT 30 =

Blue chip stock market index

The FT 30 (FT Ordinary Index or FTOI, not "FTSE 30") is a stock market index managed by the Financial Times. As an index of stocks to represent the real trends on the market, the FT 30 has been superseded by the FTSE 100, which was introduced in 1984. It was relaunched with new components in 2025.

== Background ==
The purpose of the FT 30 was to give a selection of stocks, which capture the range and essence of UK companies. The index was devised in 1935 by Maurice Green and Otto Clarke of the Financial News and was termed the "Financial News 30-share index" until that paper merged with the Financial Times in 1945. The companies listed in the index are made up of those in the industrial and commercial sectors. It excludes government stocks, and used to exclude financial sector (banks, insurance, etc.).

The FT 30 index was calculated using the geometric mean. As Rowley states, this understated movements in the index compared to using the arithmetic mean; and there are circumstances where this is undesirable.

== See also ==
- UK company law
- FTSE 100
- FTSE 250
