= Financier (disambiguation) =

A financier is a person who obtains financing for a business venture.

Financier or The Financier may also refer to:

- Financier (cake), a small French almond cake
- The Financier, a 1912 novel by Theodore Dreiser
- The Financier, a British newspaper which was merged into Financier and Bullionist
