= Miriam Gross =

British journalist and literary editor

- Born: Jerusalem
- Writing career
- Genres: Literary editor; writer

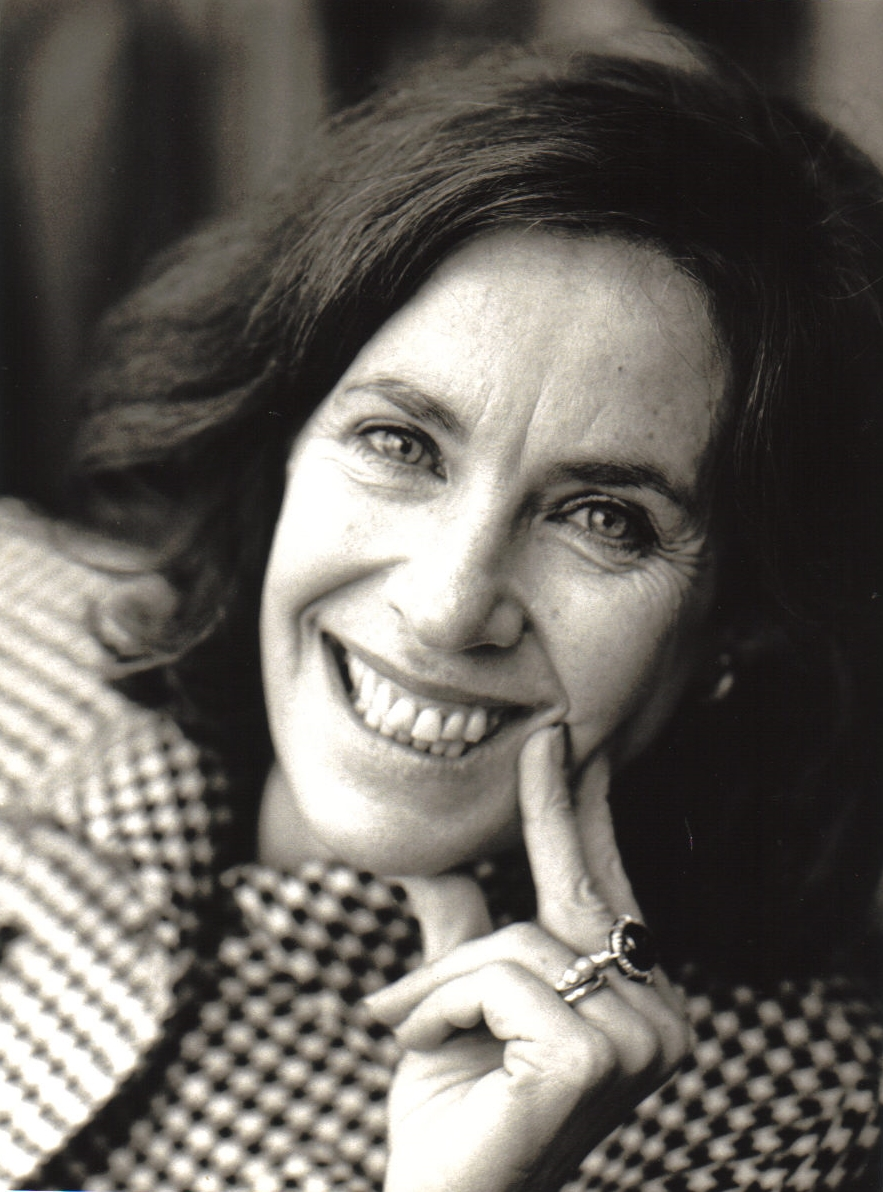
Miriam Gross

Miriam Gross, Lady Owen is a British literary editor and writer.

She was the deputy literary editor of The Observer from 1969–81, the women's editor of The Observer from 1981–84, the arts editor of The Daily Telegraph from 1986–91, and the literary editor of The Sunday Telegraph from 1991-2005. She was senior editor (and co-founder) of Standpoint magazine from 2008 to 2011. Writing in The Spectator (6 June 1988), the historian Paul Johnson said that "the beautiful and elegant Miriam Gross is queen of the lit eds."

From 1986-88, she edited Channel Four's Book Choice. She is also the editor of two collections of essays, The World of George Orwell (1971) and The World of Raymond Chandler (1977).

While at The Observer, she conducted a series of interviews, with, among others, the poet Philip Larkin, playwright Harold Pinter, thriller writer John le Carré, painters Francis Bacon and David Hockney, Nobel Prize-winning Russian poet Joseph Brodsky, novelist Anthony Powell, philosopher and historian Sir Isaiah Berlin, philosopher A.J. Ayer, and Stalin’s daughter Svetlana Stalin. (The interviews with Larkin, Bacon, Pinter and Powell were republished in her 2012 memoir, An Almost English Life: Literary, and Not so Literary Recollections; the interview with Larkin was republished in Larkin's Required Writing and that with Pinter in Ian Smith, ed., Pinter in the Theatre.)

Gross has contributed to The Spectator, as the magazine's diarist, and has written an occasional column for the Financial Times. She has also served as a judge on the Booker prize and on the George Orwell memorial prize.

As mayor of London, Boris Johnson commissioned Gross to write a policy paper on failing literacy in London schools. She is the author of a memoir, An Almost English Life: Literary, and Not so Literary Recollections.

== Family and education ==
She was born in Jerusalem in 1938. Her Jewish parents, Kurt May and Vera May (née Feinberg), fled Nazi Germany, but two of her grandparents as well as many other relatives in Germany who did not escape were murdered in the Holocaust. She grew up in Jerusalem, Switzerland and England. In England, she was educated at the progressive Dartington Hall School and at Oxford University where she read English literature at St Anne's College. She was married to the literary and theatrical critic and author John Gross from 1965–1988. The couple had two children, Tom Gross and Susanna Gross. Her son-in-law is author John Preston. Since 1993, she has been married to Sir Geoffrey Owen, the former editor of the Financial Times and formerly one of England’s leading tennis players.
