= John Gross =

English man of letters (1935–2011)

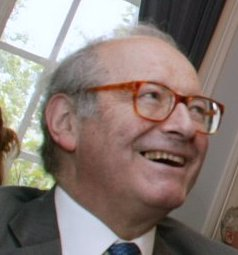
- Born: 12 March 1935; London, England, United Kingdom
- Died: 10 January 2011 (aged 75)
- Education: Wadham College, Oxford
- Occupation: Author
- Spouse: Miriam Gross
- Children: Tom Gross, Susanna Gross
- Relatives: John Preston (son-in-law); Kurt May (father-in-law)
- Writing career
- Language: English

John Gross FRSL (12 March 1935 – 10 January 2011) was an English man of letters. A leading intellectual, writer, anthologist, and critic. The Guardian (in a tribute titled "My Hero") and The Spectator were among several publications to describe Gross as "the best-read man in Britain". The Guardian's obituarist Ion Trewin wrote: "Mr Gross is one good argument for the survival of the species", a comment Gross would have disliked since he was known for his modesty. Charles Moore wrote in The Spectator: "I am left with the irritated sense that he was under-appreciated. He was too clever, too witty, too modest for our age."

Gross was the editor of The Times Literary Supplement from 1974 to 1981, senior book editor and book critic on the staff of The New York Times from 1983 to 1989 and theatre critic for The Sunday Telegraph from 1989 to 2005. He also worked as assistant editor on Encounter and as literary editor of The New Statesman and Spectator magazines.

== Early life and academic career ==
Gross was born and raised in London's East End, to Abraham Gross, a Jewish immigrant from the Polish-Jewish town of Horochów, (Gross's family escaped before the entire Jewish population was killed in The Holocaust), and to Muriel Gross, of Russian-Jewish origin, whose parents came from Vitebsk, an area later represented in the paintings of Chagall. He had one brother, Tony Gross, who founded Cutler and Gross, an international fashion eyewear business which was a supplier to the fashion and film industries. Among his cousins was the composer Lionel Bart.

Gross was educated at the Perse School in Cambridge and at the City of London School. A child prodigy, he was admitted to Wadham College, Oxford, aged 17.

After gaining first-class honours in English Literature at Oxford he won a fellowship at Princeton, where he undertook postgraduate studies. He then returned to England and taught at Queen Mary, University of London and at King's College, Cambridge, of which he was a fellow from 1962 to 1965. In later life, he taught courses at Columbia and Princeton universities.

== Books ==
His works as author include The Rise and Fall of the Man of Letters (1969; revised 1991, winner of the Duff Cooper Prize), James Joyce (1970), Shylock: Four Hundred Years in the Life of a Legend (1993), and his childhood memoir A Double Thread (2001). His works as an editor and anthologist include After Shakespeare: Writing inspired by the world’s greatest author (2002), The Oxford Book of Aphorisms (1983), The Oxford Book of Essays (1991), The Oxford Book of Comic Verse (1994), The New Oxford Book of English Prose (1998), The New Oxford Book of Literary Anecdotes (2006), The Modern Movement, Dickens and the Twentieth Century (reissued 2008), and The Oxford Book of Parodies (2010).

Several of his books won prizes. He also won praise from fellow writers. "The publication of John Gross's The Rise and Fall of the Man of Letters, when I was a bookish teenager, undoubtedly determined for me the direction I wanted my life to take... It became my Bible," wrote A.N. Wilson in The Spectator magazine in 2006.

John Gielgud wrote "I read John Gross’s fascinating Shylock book straight through twice and enjoyed it more than I can say."

John Updike called The New Oxford Book of English Prose "a marvelous gem… I wonder if there has ever been an anthology quite like it – with so vast a field – the virtually infinite expanse of English-language prose – for the anthologist to roam… I have been rapturously rolling around in John Gross’s amazing book for days."

Harold Pinter, who grew up in the same working-class East End London neighbourhood as Gross, found Gross's childhood memoir, A Double Thread, "a most rich, immensely readable and very moving book. I recognised so much."

== Journalism ==
Gross wrote regularly on literary and cultural topics for The New York Review of Books, The Times Literary Supplement, The Wall Street Journal, The New Criterion, Commentary, The Spectator, Standpoint, The Observer, The New Statesman and The New York Times.

== Public life ==
He was a trustee of London's National Portrait Gallery from 1977 to 1984. He served two terms on the English Heritage advisory committee on blue plaques, and was on the Arts and Media Committee advising the British government on the award of public honours. He served as chairman of the judges of the Booker Prize, and was a member of The Literary Society.

He was a non-executive independent director of Times Newspaper holdings, the publishers of The Times and The Sunday Times, from 1982 to 2011.

== Private life ==
John Gross was married to Miriam Gross, also a prominent literary editor, from 1965 to 1988. The couple had two children, Tom Gross and Susanna Gross. Gross lived in London, with spells of time living in New York in the 1960s and 1980s. He was a member of the Beefsteak Club.
