= Geoffrey Owen =

English academic and journalist

Sir Geoffrey Owen
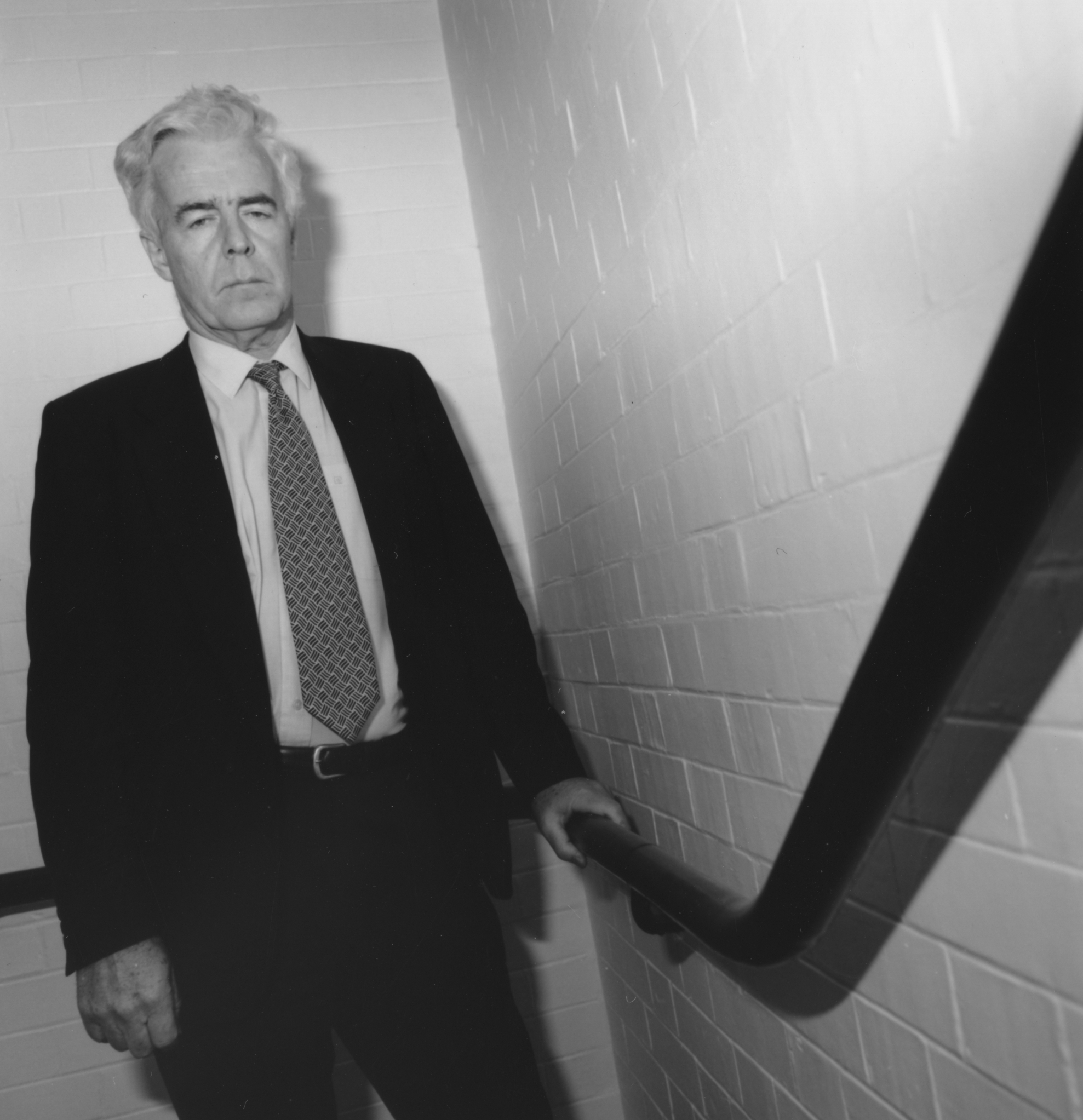
- Owen in the 1990s
- Born: 16 April 1934 (age 91)
- Education: Dragon School; Rugby School
- Alma mater: Balliol College, Oxford
- Known for: Editor of the Financial Times; Senior Fellow at the Department of Management, LSE; Executive of the Industrial Reorganisation Corporation; Non-executive Director of Laird Group plc Chairman of the Wincott Foundation
- Spouse: Miriam Gross
- Parents: L. G. Owen (father); Violet Owen (mother)
- Relatives: Tom Gross (stepson); Susanna Gross (stepdaughter)

Sir Geoffrey Owen (born 16 April 1934) is a British journalist, academic and author. He was formerly editor of the Financial Times newspaper and is currently Head of Industrial Policy at the think tank Policy Exchange in London. He is also a visiting professor in practice in the Department of Management, London School of Economics.

== Early life ==
Geoffrey Owen is the son of L. G. Owen and the tennis player Violet Owen. He was also a leading British tennis player of his generation and competed at Wimbledon and other grand slams during the 1950s.

Owen was educated at the Dragon School, Rugby School and Balliol College, Oxford. He served in the Royal Air Force for two years as part of the national service.

== Career ==
He joined the Financial Times as a feature writer in 1958. He held several posts on that paper, including industrial correspondent, industrial editor, and US correspondent based in New York. Between 1968 and 1973, he left journalism, serving first as an executive in the Industrial Reorganisation Corporation and then as personnel director in the overseas division of British Leyland Motor Corporation. He was deputy editor of the Financial Times from 1973 to 1980 and editor from 1981 to 1990. He was knighted in the 1989 New Year Honours.

He was a non-executive director of Laird Group plc from 2001 to the end of 2006.

== Personal life ==
He is married to literary editor Miriam Gross.

Media offices
Preceded by Fredy Fisher	Editor of The Financial Times; 1981-1991	Succeeded by Richard Lambert
