= Kurt May =

Israeli director of the United Restitution Organization (1896–1992)

Kurt May (1896–1992) was the Israeli director of the United Restitution Organization, which assisted victims of Nazism, from its inception in 1948 to his retirement at age 91, in 1988.

For more than forty years he played a leading role in efforts to obtain compensation for Jews and Roma (Gypsies) who had been persecuted, maltreated and robbed of their possessions by the Nazis. He presided over a worldwide organization with branches in 19 countries and a staff of more than 1000. In the course of its existence, the URO aided over 500,000 people.

He also virtually singlehandedly convinced the postwar German government to admit that the Nazis had persecuted Roma on grounds of race and ethnicity. The decision was made in a 1956 German court ruling after a 10-year legal battle, and opened up the possibility of Roma claiming compensation for Nazi crimes.

Benjamin Ferencz, the Chief Prosecutor for the United States Army at the postwar Nuremberg war crimes trials, wrote in his book "Less than Slaves (1979) that Kurt May, with whom Ferencz had worked on behalf of Holocaust victims, had also been one of the driving forces in efforts to obtain compensation for former Jewish slave laborers who had been forced to work under horrendous and often fatal conditions at I.G. Farben and other companies which collaborated closely with the Nazi SS.

I.G. Farben was the privately-owned German chemicals conglomerate allied with the Nazis that manufactured the Zyklon B gas used to commit genocide against millions of European Jews in the Holocaust. Industrialists from the company were tried at the IG Farben trial.

== Early life ==
Kurt May was born into a prosperous and assimilated German-Jewish family in the German town of Meiningen on August 15, 1896. He fought on behalf of Germany in the First World War, serving in the Ardennes and at the Russian front, and was decorated for his bravery. He was also an outstanding tennis player and played in various international tournaments as a young man. After the war and his successful law degree he built up a thriving legal practice in Jena. His associate was Walter Ledermann. With the rise of Hitler and the Nazi regime's anti-Jewish legislation of April 7, 1933 - the "Law for the Restoration of the Professional Civil Service" and the "Act of Admission to Legal Profession" Kurt May was banned from his profession. May was also singled out by the Nazis for attack after he defended a prominent Social Democrat politician who was falsely accused by the Nazis of being a communist. In consequence of the Nazi persecution of Jews, Kurt May left for Palestine in 1934.

== Family ==
In Jerusalem in 1937 he married Vera Feinberg, a fellow German-Jewish refugee who later became a judge. All their relatives in Germany were murdered in the Holocaust. They had a daughter in Jerusalem, Miriam Gross, who went on to become a distinguished literary editor in London, and who married intellectual John Gross. His grandson Tom Gross is a journalist and international affairs commentator who has also worked for Roma and other human rights issues; his granddaughter Susanna Gross is a bridge correspondent and literary editor of The Mail on Sunday.

== Obituaries ==
May died, aged 95, in 1992. Obituaries appeared in major newspapers in Europe in 1992 but have not yet been put on line. The Daily Telegraph wrote in its obituary (June 1, 1992) "Kurt May was engaged in an historic act of redress and helped tens of thousands to rebuild their lives." The Guardian wrote in its obituary (June 3, 1992) "May was an outstanding personality. Hundreds of thousands of former Nazi victims in many different countries have good reason to be grateful to him."

In its obituary, The Independent (June 3, 1992) wrote: "There are literally hundreds of thousands of people who may have never heard the name of Kurt May but who are heavily in his debt. He conducted his work with a passion for justice, an unshakable belief in the right to demand the redress for wrongs and always maintained the greatest degree of dignity in the pursuit of this cause."

The Times of London added (June 3, 1992): "As a young man Kurt May had been strikingly handsome, and he retained his looks in old age, along with an uncomplicated sense of humour and much of the stamina that had once made him an outstanding tennis player. At the age of ninety he could still set out on an Alpine walk and leave companions half his age puffing and wheezing as they tried to keep up."
