= Donald McLachlan =

Scottish journalist and author (1908–1971)

- Born: 25 September 1908; Islington, London, England
- Died: 10 January 1971 (aged 62); Scotland
- Education: Magdalen College, Oxford
- Occupations: Journalist, editor, author
- Spouse: Katherine "Kitty" Harman (1934–1971)
- Children: Andrew McLachlan; Jeremy Hugh McLachlan; Valerie Jean McLachlan; Donald Alistair McLachlan
- Relatives: Harriet Harman

Donald Harvey McLachlan (25 September 1908 – 10 January 1971) was a Scottish journalist and author who was the founding editor of The Sunday Telegraph.

== Education and career ==
Born in Islington, McLachlan was educated at the City of London School and Magdalen College, Oxford, where he gained first class honors in Philosophy, Politics and Economics. After a period as a Laming Fellow at The Queen's College, Oxford, he began his career in journalism in 1933 with a position as a sub-editor and foreign correspondent for The Times. As a correspondent, he specialized in European affairs and twice acted as an assistant correspondent in Berlin, where he worked alongside Norman Ebbutt. In 1936 McLachlan became an Assistant-Master in Winchester College, though he continued to undertake part-time editorial work. In 1938, he took over as editor of the Times Educational Supplement, a position he held for two years. During this period, he also helped to prepare The Times's Air Raid Precautions (ARP) team, which was widely regarded as the best in the City of London.

Though initially a member of the British Army's Intelligence Corps during the Second World War, McLachlan was transferred to the Naval Intelligence Division early on by Admiral John Henry Godfrey, where he was given a variety of assignments. In 1941 he became head of the Naval Propaganda sub-section NID 17Z, which focused on propaganda efforts against the Kriegsmarine. He served in this capacity for the remainder of the conflict, and reached the rank of commander. Among his colleagues during the war was Ian Fleming, who would later go on to create the character of James Bond

After the war, McLachlan returned to The Times as a leader writer and he also assisted Stanley Morison with the Times Literary Supplement. McLachlan left The Times again in 1947 to take a position as Foreign Editor of The Economist. In 1954, he moved to The Daily Telegraph, where he worked as Deputy Editor. He originated the phrase "the smack of firm government" in a leader of 3 January 1956 criticising the premiership of Anthony Eden. In 1961, he became editor of the new Sunday Telegraph, a position he held for five years.

After his retirement, McLachlan wrote two books: a history of the Naval Intelligence division Room 39 and a biography of his former Times editor, Robert M'Gowan Barrington-Ward. He died in a car accident in Scotland in 1971, just before the publication of the latter work.

== Personal life ==
In 1934 McLachlan married Katherine "Kitty" Harman, the sister of British author Elizabeth Pakenham. Together they had four children: Andrew (b. 1935), Jeremy Hugh (b. 1937), Valerie Jean (b. 1939) and Donald Alistair. One of relatives by marriage is his niece Harriet Harman, a noted Labour Party Member of Parliament who has served in a number of offices since 1997.

== Works ==
- Room 39: Naval Intelligence in Action, 1939-45, Weidenfeld and Nicolson, 1968
- In the Chair: Barrington-Ward of "The Times", 1927-1948, Weidenfeld and Nicolson, 1971, ISBN 0-297-00305-4

Media offices
Preceded by Ivor Bulmer-Thomas	Deputy Editor of The Daily Telegraph; 1954–1960	Succeeded by Maurice Green
Preceded by New position	Editor of the Sunday Telegraph; 1954–1960	Succeeded by Brian Roberts
