= Gillian O'Connor =

British journalist

- Born: 11 August 1941
- Died: 3 April 2016 (aged 74)
- Education: St Hilda's College, Oxford

Gillian O'Connor (11 August 1941 - 3 April 2016) was a British journalist, and the editor of the Investors Chronicle from 1982 to 1994.
