= The Banker =

Monthly trade magazine covering international finance

- January 2011 front cover
- Type: Monthly trade magazine
- Format: Magazine
- Owner: Financial Times (Nikkei, Inc.)
- Editor: Silvia Pavoni
- Founded: 1926; 100 years ago
- Headquarters: 1 Friday Street; London; EC4M 9BT; England
- Country: United Kingdom
- Circulation: 15,000
- ISSN: 0005-5395
- Website: www.thebanker.com

The Banker is an English-language monthly international financial affairs publication owned by the Financial Times and edited in London, United Kingdom. The magazine was first published in January 1926 through founding editor Brendan Bracken of the Financial News, who went on to become the chairman of the Financial Times from 1945 to 1958.

Since its founding, the magazine has claimed a dedication to the international perspective through features, interviews, multi-media applications, and events. The Banker is read in over 120 countries. It combines in-depth regional and country coverage with reports on global financial markets, regulation and policy, cash management and securities services, commodities and carbon finance, infrastructure and project finance, trading and technology, clearing and settlement, and management and governance issues.

The Banker is read most widely in banks, financial institutions, multilateral corporations, central banks, and finance ministries around the world. Approximately 60% of its readers are CEO/President and CFO/Treasurers of their organisations.

== Features and awards ==
The Banker's primary focus is global financial comment and insight, featuring opinion pieces, profiles, and interviews with leading banking and finance figures. The Bracken Column is named after Brendan Bracken, the founding editor of The Banker, and serves as a think-tank for financial sector participants.

The Bank of the Year Awards is an annual awards event recognising the top financial institutions in the world. The most recent event took place in December 2021.

Top 1000 World Banks is published annually in July based on the findings of The Banker Database. This ranking serves to recognise global leaders in the industry for their achievements, ranking the world's banks by Tier 1 capital globally, as well as by individual country. The awards are the industry’s most widely used index of global banking, and are internationally recognised as the definitive guide to the soundness, strength, and profitability of banks. The banks are assessed by Tier 1 capital, with secondary rankings by assets, capital/asset ratio, real profit growth, profit on average capital, and return on assets. In 2013 ICBC was ranked in top place, the first time ever for a Chinese bank and has retained the top position since then, including the 2022 ranking.

As well as The Bank of the Year Awards, The Banker also conducts awards for Deals of the Year, Innovation in Digital Banking, Transaction Banking, Investment Banking, Finance Minister of the Year, Central Bank Governor of the Year, Private Banking, and Islamic Bank of the Year.

Top Islamic Financial Institutions annual listing assesses the global state of the Islamic banking and finance market today. Since 2007, it has aimed to help estimate the size and growth rate of the emerging Islamic financial marketplace.

== Top 1000 World Banks ==
The Banker is known for its annual rankings of the world's top banks. Below are the "Top 10 World Banks" from its "Top 1000 World Banks" ranking in 2016:

| Rank | Banks | Country |
|---|---|---|
| 1 | Industrial and Commercial Bank of China | China |
| 2 | China Construction Bank | China |
| 3 | JPMorgan Chase | United States |
| 4 | Bank of China | China |
| 5 | Agricultural Bank of China | China |
| 6 | Bank of America | United States |
| 7 | Citigroup | United States |
| 8 | Wells Fargo | United States |
| 9 | HSBC | United Kingdom |
| 10 | Mitsubishi UFJ Financial Group | Japan |

The table below shows the top bank ranked by Tier 1 capital since 2000:

| Rank | Banks | Country |
|---|---|---|
| 2016 | Industrial and Commercial Bank of China | China |
| 2015 | Industrial and Commercial Bank of China | China |
| 2014 | Industrial and Commercial Bank of China | China |
| 2013 | Industrial and Commercial Bank of China | China |
| 2012 | Bank of America | United States |
| 2011 | Bank of America | United States |
| 2010 | Bank of America | United States |
| 2009 | JPMorgan Chase | United States |
| 2008 | HSBC | United Kingdom |
| 2007 | Bank of America | United States |
| 2006 | Citigroup | United States |
| 2005 | Citigroup | United States |
| 2004 | Citigroup | United States |
| 2003 | Citigroup | United States |
| 2002 | Citigroup | United States |
| 2001 | Citigroup | United States |
| 2000 | Citigroup | United States |

== Editors ==
The editors of The Banker are (as of January 2025):

- Silvia Pavoni (Editor-in-chief)
- Chris Newlands (Executive Editor)
- John Everington (Senior Editor)
- Anita Hawser (Europe Editor)
- Kimberley Long (Asia Editor)
- Michael Klimes (Investment Banking and Capital Markets Editor)
- Aliya Shibli (Senior Reporter)
- Sally Hickey (Reporter)
- Sam Friend (Digital Content Editor)
- Simon Duffy (Editorial Coordinator)
