= America's Intelligence Wire =

- Industry: News dissemination
- Area served: Worldwide
- Services: Newswire
- Parent: Financial Times, Ltd

The America's Intelligence Wire is a daily general newswire service. The news service is owned and published by Financial Times, Ltd, which also operates companion newswire Europe Intelligence Wire.

The wire carries transcripts of MSNBC programs such as Scarborough Country from January 1999.

== See also ==
- Business and Company Resource Center, Gale Cengage Learning, 2009
