= Maurice Green (journalist) =

British newspaper editor

- Born: James Maurice Spurgeon Green; 8 December 1906; Padiham, Lancashire, England
- Died: 19 July 1987 (aged 80); Winchester, Hampshire, England
- Education: Rugby School; University College, Oxford
- Employer(s): Financial News; The Times; The Daily Telegraph
- Spouses: Pearl Oko (m. 1930; died 1934) Janet Grace Norie (m. 1936)
- Children: 2

(James) Maurice Spurgeon Green (Born in Padiham, Lancashire, England, 8 December 1906 - 19 July 1987) was a British journalist and newspaper editor. He was one of the two sons of Lieutenant-Colonel James Edward Green, and his wife, Constance Ingraham-Johnson.

== Early life ==
Green attended Rugby School and University College, Oxford, gaining a half-blue in chess, before becoming a journalist on the Financial News. He was awarded double first-class degree in Greats and was counted among the most brilliant of his generation. He quickly made an impact, and was appointed editor in 1934. With Otto Clarke, he devised the Financial News 30-share index, which later served as the basis for the FTSE 100. In 1938, he became Financial and Industrial Editor of The Times.

== Later life ==
During World War II served as an officer with the Royal Artillery.

He was released from the army in 1944 and returned to The Times, earning a promotion to Assistant Editor in 1953. In 1961, he was appointed Assistant Editor of the Daily Telegraph, and became Editor for ten years from 1964. He used his time to champion free market economics and the emerging Thatcherite wing of the Conservative Party.

Following his retirement, Green continued to write for the Telegraph, and served as President of the Institute of Journalists from 1976 to 1977, using the post to attack trade unionism.

== Personal life ==
He married first, on 15 January 1930, Pearl Oko of Cincinnati, Ohio, who died in 1934. On 14 October 1936 he married Janet Grace Norie, daughter of Major-General C. E. M. Norie. They had two sons. He died on 19 July 1987 at Winchester, Hampshire.

Media offices
Preceded by Oscar Rudolf Hobson	Editor of the Financial News; 1934–1938	Succeeded by Hargreaves Parkinson
Preceded by Donald McLachlan	Deputy Editor of The Daily Telegraph; 1960–1964	Succeeded by Colin Welch
Preceded by Colin Coote	Editor of The Daily Telegraph; 1964–1974	Succeeded by Bill Deedes
