= Susanna Gross =

English journalist and bridge player (1967–2025)

- Born: 31 July 1967; London, England
- Died: 11 November 2025 (aged 58)
- Education: Godolphin and Latymer School; University of York
- Occupations: Bridge player; journalist
- Years active: 1993–2025
- Employer(s): The Mail on Sunday (1999–2019); The Spectator (2000–2025)
- Spouse: John Preston (m. 2005)
- Children: 2
- Parents: John Gross (father); Geoffrey Owen (stepfather); Miriam Gross (mother)
- Relatives: Kurt May (grandfather); Tom Gross (brother)

Susanna Gross (31 July 1967 – 11 November 2025) was an English journalist and bridge player who was literary editor of The Mail on Sunday from 1999 until 2019, and bridge columnist for The Spectator from 2000 until October 2025.

Gross played bridge in many national and international competitions and represented England in home international competition for the Lady Milne Trophy (which is the annual tournament for women teams, parallel in structure to the Camrose Trophy competition for open teams).

== Life and career ==
Gross was born on 31 July 1967, in London. She was educated at Godolphin and Latymer School and the University of York. She was an obituaries editor at the Daily Mail starting in 1993, was features editor of Harper's Bazaar, and was deputy editor of The Week.

The daughter of literary critic and writer John Gross and literary editor Miriam Gross, and the granddaughter of humanitarian Kurt May, she was married to the novelist and critic John Preston from 2005, with whom she had two children. Her brother Tom Gross is a journalist and international affairs commentator, specialising in the Middle East.

After her mother's remarriage, Gross was the stepdaughter of Sir Geoffrey Owen.

Gross died of lung cancer on 11 November 2025, at the age of 58.
