= Hargreaves Parkinson =

British newspaper editor (FT, Economist)

Hargreaves Parkinson (3 June 1896 – 23 May 1950) was editor of the Financial Times from 1945 until 1950. He was educated at Blackpool Grammar School and King's College London. After serving in France during the First World War with the Royal Garrison Artillery, he joined the Department of Trade before becoming Assistant Press Officer for the National Savings Committee and then City Editor for The Economist. He became editor of the Financial News in 1938, and when it merged with the Financial Times in 1945 he moved over to edit the merged paper. A noted author, he died on 23 May 1950.

== Notes ==
Media offices
Preceded by Maurice Green	Editor of the Financial News; 1938–1945	Succeeded by Position abolished
Preceded by Albert George Cole	Editor of The Financial Times; 1945–1950	Succeeded by Gordon Newton
