= FDi Intelligence =

Foreign direct investment magazine

fDi Intelligence
- Type: Bi-monthly newsmagazine (in the UK, a registered newspaper)
- Format: Magazine
- Owner: Nikkei Inc. via The Financial Times Ltd
- Editor: Jacopo Dettoni
- Founded: 2001
- Headquarters: Financial Times; Bracken House; 1 Friday Street; London; EC4M 9BT; United Kingdom
- Circulation: 15,488
- Website: www.fDiIntelligence.com

fDi Intelligence is an English-language bi-monthly news and foreign direct investment (FDI) publication, providing an up-to-date review of global investment activity. The A4 glossy pages reach a circulation of 15,488 ABC audited, active corporate and crossborder investment professionals across the world.

fDi Intelligence is a central part of the fDi Intelligence portfolio of investment products and services from the Financial Times.

== Features ==
fDi Intelligence focuses primarily on FDI news and in-depth analysis of the corporate investment climate across many sectors. Regular columns comprise the following:

Name	Description
News	Updates on companies, markets and investments as well as the latest investor/host-country legal disputes.
Global Outlook	Reporting and analysis of the corporate trends and investment patterns, along with C-level interviews.
Corporate Strategy	Investigates the key company and/or project profiles as well as including a discussion under the best practice topic including key information for specific investments
Regional sections	Global news, commentary and data snapshots, followed by in-depth features and reports on key foreign direct investment (FDI) markets.
Think Tank	Knowledge and insight from leaders in FDI
Sectors	Global updates on key FDI sectors, including data, rankings, feature articles and spotlight location guides highlighting successful clusters.
Research	The numbers and hard facts behind global greenfield investment flows

== FDI Report and Rankings ==
fDi Intelligence publishes an annual fDi Report which provides an overview of the global FDI statistics as well as a breakdown of the current picture in key regions like Asia-Pacific, Europe, North America, Latin America & the Caribbean, Middle East & Africa, and the BRIC nations. It also focuses on a current hot FDI topic (in 2013 it investigated taxation in FDI) and makes predictions for the FDI outlook for the following year.

A series of bi-annual rankings are published by fDi Intelligence which looks at the infrastructure, incentives and capabilities of cities and regions for attracting future inward investment. This includes:

- Middle East and African Countries of the Future
- American Cities of the Future
- Asia-Pacific Cities of the Future
- Caribbean and Central American Countries of the Future
- European Cities and Regions of the Future
- Global Free Zones of the Year
- Global Cities of the Future
- Polish Cities of the Future
- Chinese Provinces of the Future
- Middle East and North Africa Free Zones of the Year

== Staff ==
The staff of fDi Intelligence consists of :

- Editor: Jacopo Dettoni
- Global markets editor: Alex Irwin-Hunt
- Senior contributor: Danielle Myles
