= John Gardiner (businessman) =

British businessman and financial journalist (1936–2023)

- Born: June 1936; Lancing, Sussex
- Died: 18 November 2023
- Occupation(s): Businessman and financial journalist

John Anthony Gardiner (June 1936 – 18 November 2023) was a British businessman and financial journalist who was chairman of Tesco from 1997 to 2004.

== Life and career ==
John Anthony Gardiner was born in Lancing, Sussex in June 1936. He married Celia Adams in 1961. From 1997, he was the chairman of supermarket chain Tesco. On his retirement in March 2004, Gardiner was succeeded as chairman by Sir David Reid, who had been deputy chairman since 1996.

John Gardiner died on 18 November 2023, at the age of 87. He was predeceased by his wife in 2016, and was survived by their three children, Britt, Anna and Tracey, as well as two grandsons.
