= United Restitution Organization =

Legal aid service for victims of Nazi persecution

The United Restitution Organization (URO) was established in 1948 as a legal aid service to assist victims of Nazi persecution living outside Germany in making restitution and indemnification claims against Germany and Austria. The URO has served over 250,000 clients. It helped Jews, Roma, and other victims of Nazi crimes. At its most expansive, the URO maintained 29 offices in 15 countries around the world. British barrister Norman Bentwich was the chairman of the URO board from 1948 until his death in 1971, and Kurt May, a German-born lawyer who had fled the Nazis in 1934 after he defended a leading Social Democrat wrongly accused of being a Communist, served as its director from the early 1950s until 1990.
