= Harold Wincott =

British economist and journalist

Harold Edward Wincott CBE (13 September 1906 – 5 March 1969) was a British economist and journalist.

== Early life ==
Harold Wincott was born in north London, where his father ran a small family business of heraldic engravers. He went to Hornsey County School, leaving at 16.

== Career ==
Wincott edited the Investors Chronicle for twenty-one years and was a columnist for the Financial Times. He was appointed a CBE in 1963 and wrote pamphlets for the Institute of Economic Affairs, a free-market think-tank based in Westminster, London.

== Legacy ==
According to one contemporary, Wincott had an "enormous influence on City thinking"; it was Wincott who invented the character Solomon Binding in his column as a joke on the numerous "solemn and binding" pledges made at TUC Conferences. The Conservative politician John Biffen has claimed: "If I had a mentor, it was probably Harold Wincott".

=== Wincott Foundation ===
The Wincott Foundation was established in 1970 in honour of Harold Wincott's achievements, with the purpose of supporting and encouraging high quality economic, financial, and business journalism. The Foundation sponsors annual awards for economic, financial, and business journalism in the UK, and provides fellowships and scholarships to journalists.

== Bibliography ==
- The Stock Exchange (1946)
- Beginners Please (1961)
- The business of capitalism: A selection of unconventional essays on economic problems of the 1960s (1968)
