= Fredy Fisher =

British journalist and businessperson (1922–1993)

Max Henry Fisher (30 May 1922 – 29 August 1993) was a German-British journalist and businessperson. He edited the Financial Times between 1973 and 1980.

== Background ==
Fisher was born in Berlin on 20 May 1922. He was Jewish. He attended the Fichte-Gymnasium in the city. In 1936, his family fled Germany and moved to Switzerland due to the threat posed by the Nazis. Fisher attended Rendcomb College in Gloucestershire between 1936 and 1940. He was sent to an internment camp in Australia due to the wartime "enemy aliens" regulations. He was interned in the country between 1940 and 1942. Starting in 1946, Fisher studied history at Lincoln College, Oxford University, where he received a first-class undergraduate degree.

== Career ==
Fisher served in the UK military during World War II.

Between 1949 and 1956, Fisher worked on a Foreign Office project in the Office's library that related to German war documents.

Fisher worked at the Financial Times from 1957 until 1980, where he served as editor between 1973 and 1980. While assistant editor of the Financial Times, he grew the newspaper's industrial coverage and introduced a "management page" to the newspaper. Under his editorship, the newspaper's editorials became more incisive and the newspaper made the decision to start to print another edition, aimed at a broader European audience, in Frankfurt. Fisher was succeeded as editor by Geoffrey Owen in 1980.

Starting in 1981, Fisher served as the Director of S. G. Warburg & Co. Ltd, an investment bank.

Fisher was a governor of the London School of Economics and Political Science between 1981 and 1991.

== Personal life and death ==
Fisher was married to Rosemary Maxwell Fisher; they had three children.

Fisher died on 29 August 1993, at the age of 71.
