= Money Management =

- Editor: Dan Jones
- Frequency: Monthly
- First issue: 1962
- Company: Financial Times Group
- Country: United Kingdom
- Based in: London
- Website: www.ftadviser.com/MM

Money Management magazine is a monthly personal finance magazine and is published by the Financial Times Group. It was originally launched in 1962 as the Unitholder and later became a part of the FT Business stable. In 2005 FT Business was integrated into Financial Times Ltd.

Money Management is written predominantly for financial professionals such as independent financial advisers and mortgage brokers. The current cover price is £7.25.

The title is edited by Dan Jones. He has written on fund management, stock markets, banking and personal finance for over a decade, latterly at the FT Group and prior to that at Incisive Media.

Jones took over the magazine following the departure of predecessor Jon Cudby in July 2016. Cudby had been at the helm since 2012, following on from Janet Walford OBE, who had edited the title for 25 years.

The Money Management editorial team is based at the Financial Times newspaper's offices at Number One Southwark Bridge, London. Current full-time staff at the magazine are: Dan Jones, editor; Dave Baxter, deputy editor; and Craig Rickman, special projects editor.

Each year the magazine holds the Money Management Financial Planner of the Year awards, which is the highlight of the personal finance calendar for IFAs. The awards are presented at a black tie dinner in London every October. The year 2015 marked the 20th annual awards.

Up to a dozen individual category award winners and runners up are announced, plus the overall winner of the Financial Planner of the Year who receives a £5,000 cash prize and engraved trophy.

Money Management and its reporters have won 57 awards for journalistic excellence.
