= Financier and Bullionist =

The Financier and Bullionist was a British daily newspaper published in London. It focused on finance. The paper renamed Financier and Bullionist in 1900 was the result of the merger of two rival financial publications: The Financier and Daily Bullionist (founded as The Bullionist).

== Origins ==
=== The Financier (1870-1900) ===
The Financier was established in 1870.

=== The Bullionist / Daily Bullionist (1866-1900) ===
The Bullionist was established in 1866, and later renamed Daily Bullionist. In 1900, it merged with the rival The Financier.

== After merger: Financier and Bullionist (1900–1924) ==
After the 1900 merger, the publication was renamed the Financier and Bullionist and continued publication for 24 years as Financier and Bullionist, before merging in 1924 with the rival Financial News.

== See also ==
- Financial News (1884–1945)
