= Standpoint (magazine) =

British cultural and political magazine

- Executive editor: Andreas Campomar
- Former editors: Daniel Johnson, 2008 - 2018; Michael Mosbacher, 2018 - 2019; Edward Lucas, 2019 - 2020
- Categories: politics, world affairs, arts and culture
- Frequency: ten times per year
- First issue: June 2008
- Final issue: December 2020
- Company: Social Affairs Unit Magazines Limited
- Country: United Kingdom
- Language: English
- ISSN: 1757-1111

Standpoint was a British cultural and political magazine, originally published monthly, that debuted in June 2008. It ceased to be published regularly in 2020, with a final issue coming out in mid-2021.

Standpoint was based in London and was co-founded by Daniel Johnson, Miriam Gross, Jonathan Foreman, and Michael Mosbacher; Johnson was its first editor, but announced that he was standing down in 2018.

In 2019, editor Edward Lucas said that the magazine was to be "a lively champion of unfashionable causes such as the virtues of western civilisation and transatlanticism". Later that year, he also said: "We fight culture wars vigorously, mix polemic with mockery, and are all in favour of triggering people."

The magazine was run by the Social Affairs Unit, a spinoff charity of a neoliberal economic thinktank, the Institute of Economic Affairs. It was initially funded by British Marine chairman Alan Bekhor and then by other rich donors, such as Jeremy Hosking, who donated £850,000 in 2019.
