= Financial News (1884–1945) =

1884–1945 daily British newspaper published in London

- Type: Daily newspaper
- Format: Broadsheet
- Editor: Harry Marks (founder)
- Founded: 23 January 1884, as Financial and Mining News; July 1884: name changed to Financial News; 1945: merged with Financial Times
- Headquarters: London

The Financial News was a daily British newspaper published in London. It was founded in 1884 by Harry Marks. Marks began his career with United States newspapers. He set up Financial News to expose fraudulent investments. Marks himself was key to the paper's early growth, when it had a buccaneering nature to fight against corruption and to compete with the Financial Times. After Marks' death, sales declined. Financial News was subsequently bought by publishers Eyre & Spottiswoode in 1928 and run by Brendan Bracken. It eventually merged with Financial Times in 1945.

== History ==
=== Early history ===
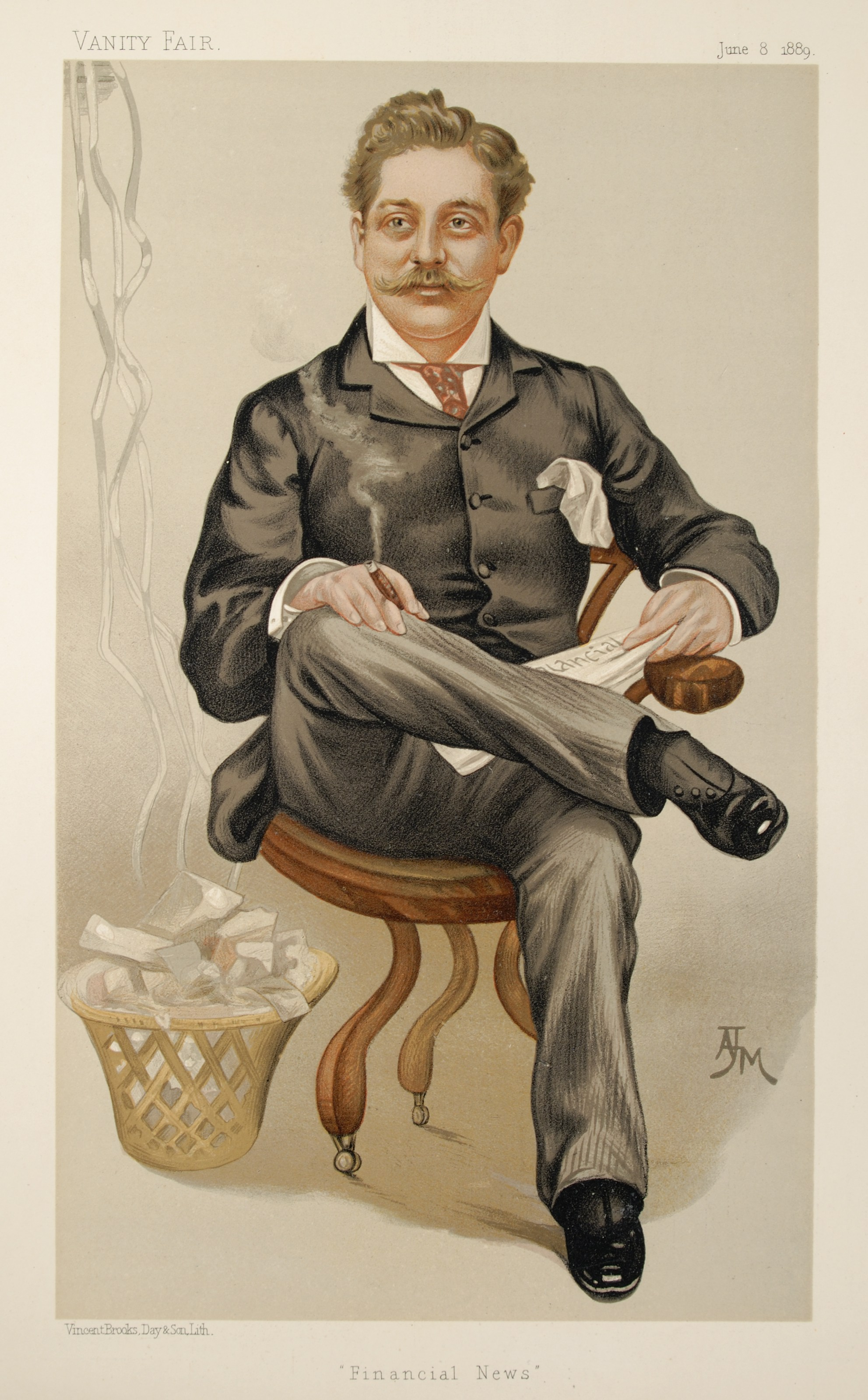
Financial News founder Harry Marks as caricatured in Vanity Fair, June 1889

The first four-page edition of the Financial and Mining News appeared on 23 January 1884. It adopted the shorter title, Financial News, that July. Founder Harry Marks imported techniques he had learned in the United States which was to target those offering questionable investment schemes. His intention was that his paper should be known for campaigning.

The newspaper scored an early significant success in exposing corruption in local government. Marks himself was one of the main authors of a series of articles that began appearing on 25 October 1886 and carried on for nearly a year. The newspaper uncovered the involvement of officials and members of the Metropolitan Board of Works that ran local government services in London in schemes to personally enrich themselves. However, the early years saw the company frequently summoned to the law courts to defend libel actions. There were three major cases between 1888 and 1890.

The paper gained a rival when the Financial Times, published by Horatio Bottomley, appeared in 1888. The two papers frequently attacked each other's advertisers, and criticised the investment schemes the other promoted, until a truce was worked out after a bad-tempered dispute over "the Nitrate King" Colonel J. T. North who was developing the Nitrate Railway in South America. After that they continued as competitors, but with a nature of friendly rivalry.

It was a financially successful venture. Marks noted the company on the stock market in March 1898, with the understanding that he would continue as editor. Its success continued, and at the ordinary general meeting in January 1911, the company announced a dividend and bonus amounting to 35% on ordinary shares. The announcement brought cheers. The paper was among those that exposed the details of the Marconi scandal.

=== Marks' departure ===
Handing over the editorship in 1909 to Ellis Powell, Marks remained the controlling influence as proprietor. He suffered increasing bouts of ill-health due to gout and had at least one stroke in 1915. He was forced to cease any active involvement in the newspaper and died in December 1916. Although he left his interest to a nephew, the existing board fought off his attempts to take control. The Marks estate was eventually sold in 1919, and most of the Financial News shares were bought by John Jarvis. In 1926 it was sold again to the Trireme Trust. Jarvis remained as chairman. However, the mounting losses of the Morning Post, which the Trust also owned, forced another sale in 1928. During this period it absorbed one major rival, the Financier and Bullionist.

=== Brendan Bracken ===
The new ownership was put together by Brendan Bracken, who had been elected to the board of Eyre & Spottiswoode. Bracken persuaded the board to buy the Financial News and then bought a number of other publications (the Investors Chronicle and a half-share in The Economist among them). Bracken himself took responsibility for the Financial News. Circulation rose in the early 1930s, but the Financial Times was still selling about three or four times as many copies. In spring 1937 sales hit 10,000, but only briefly.

When Adolf Hitler was appointed Chancellor of Germany, the Financial News lead heading was "Heil Hitler!". It argued that Hitler was the prisoner of the non-Nazi majority in his government, and that the Nazis were highly unlikely to "attempt to base their power on armed forces". However, the paper soon changed its line, arguing at the time of the remilitarization of the Rhineland that a stand would have to be taken against German military aggression. Hargreaves Parkinson became editor in 1938.

=== Merger and closure ===
During the Second World War, Bracken became close to Lord Camrose, the proprietor since 1919 of the Financial Times. The two privately agreed to raise their advertising rates to protect their finances, and eventually agreed that the other would have first option if one wanted to sell. Towards the end of the war, Camrose decided to sell the Financial Times, and arrangements for a merger were put in place. The financial deal was a complex one. The Financial News raised the finances to buy a controlling interest in the Financial Times by selling its own offices and investments and by a share issue. Financial News made up the full amount by selling the copyright and goodwill of the Financial News to Financial Times. Camrose himself bought some Financial News shares to help the deal along.

The Financial News ceased publication on 1 October 1945. The Financial Times appeared at first with the title "Financial Times, incorporating The Financial News". The three top jobs in the new merged paper went to former Financial News employees, including Parkinson as editor.

== Editors ==
1884: Harry Hananel Marks
1916: Ellis Powell
1921: Herbert O'Neill
1921: W. A. Doman and William Lang
1924: Laming Worthington-Evans
1925: Hilton Young
1929: Oscar Rudolf Hobson
1934: Maurice Green
1938: Hargreaves Parkinson

== Sources ==
- Griffiths, Dennis (2006). Fleet Street: Five hundred years of the Press. British Library.
- Kynaston, David (1988). The Financial Times: A Centenary History. Viking.
