= Financial Times =

British newspaper

- Cover of the 22 February 2021 issue
- Type: Daily newspaper
- Format: Broadsheet (345mm x 560mm); Digital
- Owner(s): The Financial Times Ltd. (Nikkei Inc.)
- Founder: James Sheridan
- Editor: Roula Khalaf
- Deputy editor: Patrick Jenkins
- Founded: 9 January 1888; 138 years ago
- Political alignment: Liberalism; Conservative liberalism Centre to centre-right
- Language: English
- Headquarters: Bracken House; London, England
- Circulation: 104,971 (as of September 2025)
- Sister newspapers: Nikkei Asia
- ISSN: 0307-1766
- OCLC number: 60638918
- Website: www.ft.com

The Financial Times (FT) is a British daily newspaper printed in broadsheet and also published digitally that focuses on business and economic current affairs. Based in London, the paper is owned by a Japanese holding company, Nikkei, with core editorial offices across Britain, the United States and continental Europe. In July 2015, Pearson sold the publication to Nikkei for £844 million (US$1.32 billion) after owning it since 1957. In 2019, it reported one million paying subscriptions, three-quarters of which were digital subscriptions. In 2023, it was reported to have 1.3 million subscribers of which 1.2 million were digital. The primary focus is on financial journalism and economic analysis rather than generalist reporting. The paper sponsors an annual book award and publishes a "Person of the Year" feature.

The paper was founded in January 1888 as the London Financial Guide and rebranded a month later as the Financial Times. It was first circulated around metropolitan London by James Sheridan, who, along with his brother and Horatio Bottomley, sought to report on city business opposite the Financial News. The succeeding half-century of competition between the two papers eventually culminated in a 1945 merger, led by Brendan Bracken, which established it as one of the largest business newspapers in the world.

Globalisation from the late 19th to mid-20th centuries facilitated editorial expansion for the FT, with the paper adding opinion columns, special reports, political cartoons, readers' letters, book reviews, technology articles and global politics features. The paper is often characterised by its light-orange (salmon) newsprint. It is supplemented by its lifestyle magazine (FT Magazine), weekend edition (FT Weekend) and some industry publications.

The editorial stance of the Financial Times centres on economic liberalism, particularly advocacy of free trade and free markets. Since its founding, it has supported liberal democracy, favouring classically liberal politics and policies from international governments; its newsroom is independent from its editorial board, and it is considered a newspaper of record. Due to its history of economic commentary, the FT publishes a variety of financial indices, primarily the FTSE All-Share Index. Since the late 20th century, the paper's typical depth of coverage has linked it with a white-collar, educated, and financially literate readership. Because of this tendency, the FT has traditionally been regarded as a centrist to centre-right liberal, neo-liberal, and conservative-liberal newspaper. The Financial Times is headquartered in Bracken House at 1 Friday Street, near the city's financial centre, where it maintains its publishing house, corporate centre, and main editorial office.

== History ==
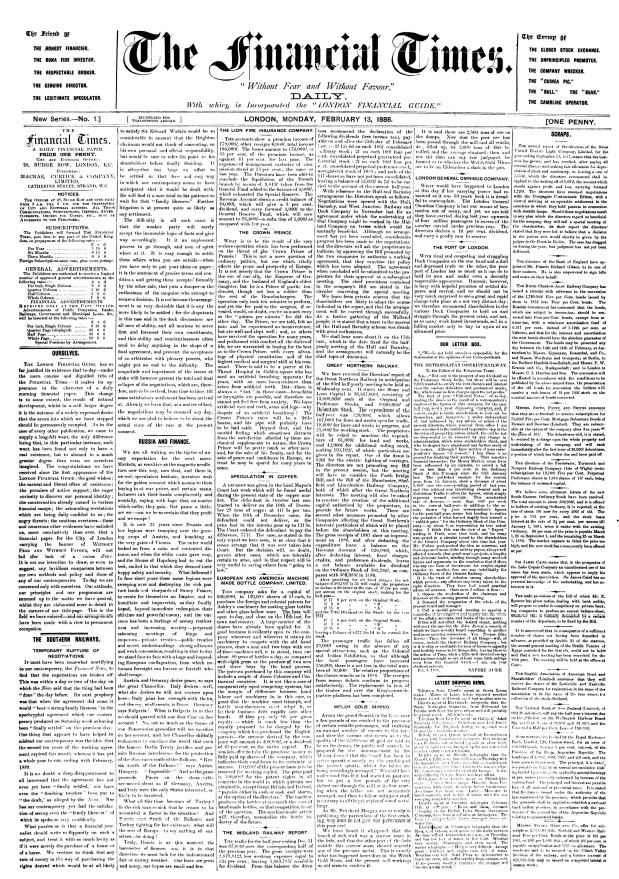
The front page of the Financial Times on 13 February 1888

=== Origins ===
The FT was launched as the London Financial Guide on 10 January 1888, renaming itself the Financial Times on 13 February the same year. Describing itself as the friend of "The Honest Financier, the Bona Fide Investor, the Respectable Broker, the Genuine Director, and the Legitimate Speculator", it was a four-page journal. The readership was the financial community of the City of London, its only rival being the more daring and slightly older (founded in 1884) Financial News. On 2 January 1893, the FT began printing on light pink paper to distinguish it from the similarly named Financial News. The pink tint came from the colour of the China clay they began sourcing from the Bodelva clay pit near St Austell, Cornwall, and at the time, it was cheaper not to bleach the paper (several other more general newspapers, such as The Sporting Times, had the same policy), but nowadays it is more expensive since the paper has to be dyed specially.

=== Purchase by the Berry brothers ===
The Berry brothers, Lord Camrose and Gomer Berry (later Lord Kemsley), purchased the Financial Times in 1919.

=== Purchase by Brendan Bracken; merger with the Financial News ===
In 1945, Brendan Bracken purchased the Financial Times from Lord Camrose, and, following 57 years of rivalry, merged it with the Financial News to form a single six-page newspaper. The Financial Times had a higher circulation, while the Financial News provided much of the editorial talent. The "Lex" column was also introduced from Financial News. With this purchase and merger, Bracken is credited as being "the effective founding father of the modern Financial Times, Britain's highest quality daily newspaper."

=== Gordon Newton and "direct recruitment" ===
Gordon Newton, a Cambridge graduate, took over as editor in 1949, and immediately introduced a policy (then most unusual in Fleet Street) of direct recruitment of new university graduates, mainly from Oxbridge, as its trainee journalists. Many of them proceeded to have distinguished careers elsewhere in journalism and British public life and became the mainstay of the paper's own editorial strengths until the 1990s. The first such "direct recruit" was future leading British economist Andrew Shonfield; the second was (later Sir) William Rees-Mogg, who went on, via The Sunday Times, to edit The Times in 1967 following its acquisition by Roy Thomson. Other FT Oxbridge recruits included the future Chancellor of the Exchequer Nigel Lawson. The FT's distinctive recruitment policy for Fleet Street journalists was never popular with the National Union of Journalists and ceased in 1966 following the recruitment from Oxford of Richard Lambert, himself a future editor of the FT.

=== Purchase by Pearson and growth into a global newspaper ===
Meanwhile, Pearson had bought the paper in 1957. Over the years, the paper grew in size, readership, and breadth of coverage. It established correspondents in cities around the world, reflecting a renewed impetus in the world economy towards globalisation. As cross-border trade and capital flows increased during the 1970s, the FT began international expansion, facilitated by developments in technology and the growing acceptance of English as the international language of business. On 1 January 1979, the first FT (Continental Europe edition) was printed outside the UK, in Frankfurt; printing in the US began in July 1985.

Since then, with increased international coverage, the FT has become a global newspaper, printed in 22 locations with five international editions to serve the UK, continental Europe, the US, Asia and the Middle East.

The European edition is distributed throughout continental Europe and Africa. It is printed Monday to Saturday at five centres across Europe, reporting on matters concerning the European Union, the euro and European corporate affairs. In 1994 FT launched a luxury lifestyle magazine, How To Spend It. In 2009 it launched a standalone website for the magazine.

=== FT.com ===
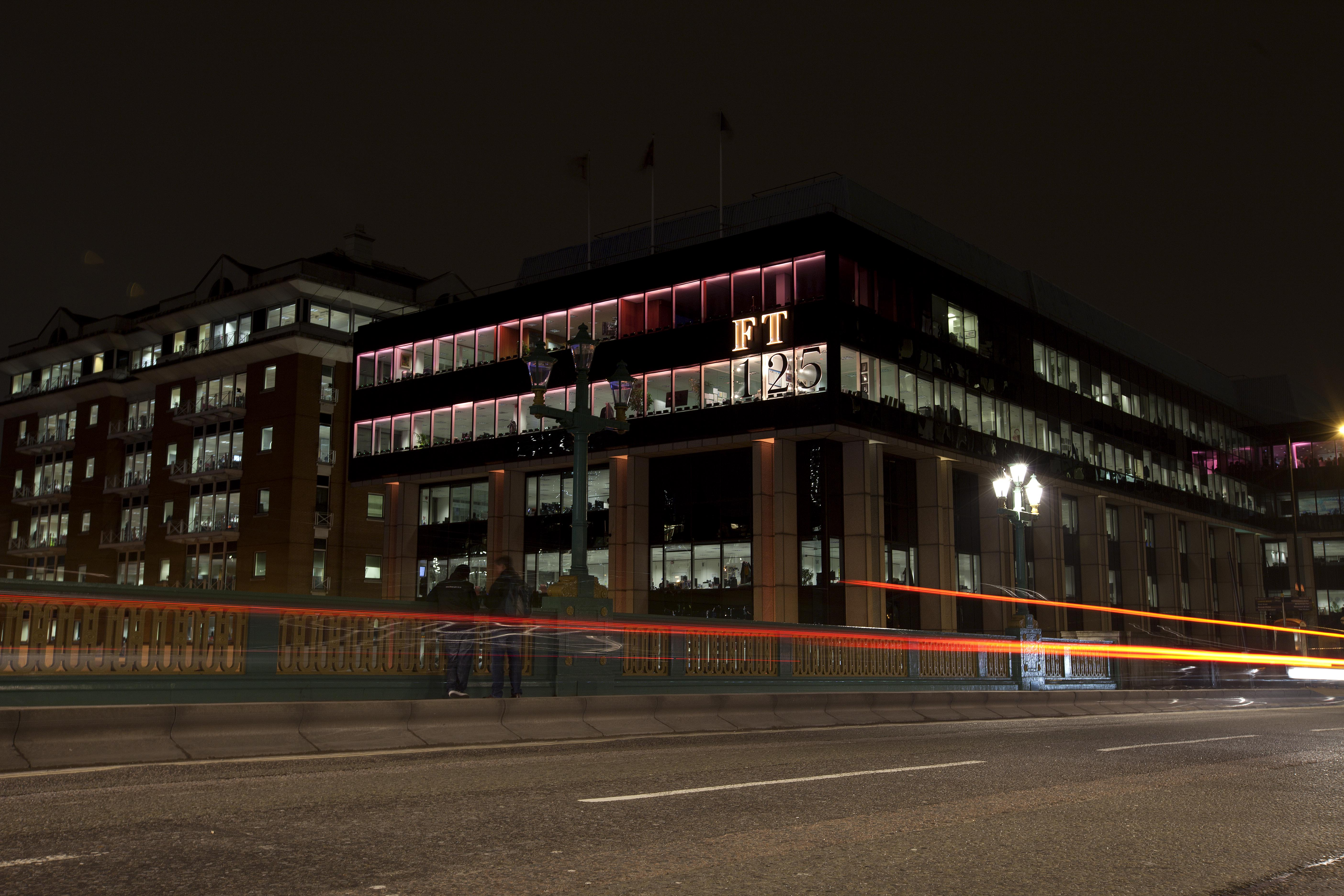
The former London offices of the Financial Times at One Southwark Bridge

On 13 May 1995, the Financial Times group made its first foray into the online world with the launch of FT.com. This provided a summary of news from around the globe, which was supplemented in February 1996 with stock price coverage. The second-generation site was launched in spring 1996. The site was funded by advertising and contributed to the online advertising market in the UK in the late 1990s. Between 1997 and 2000, the site underwent several revamps and changes of strategy, as the FT Group and Pearson reacted to the changes online. FT introduced subscription services in 2002. FT.com is one of the few UK news sites successfully funded by individual subscription.

In 1997, the FT launched a US edition, printed in New York, Chicago, Los Angeles, San Francisco, Dallas, Atlanta, Orlando and Washington, D.C., although the newspaper was first printed outside New York City in 1985. In September 1998 the FT became the first UK-based newspaper to sell more copies internationally than within the UK. In 2000 the Financial Times started publishing a German-language edition, Financial Times Deutschland, with a news and editorial team based in Hamburg. Its initial circulation in 2003 was 90,000. It was originally a joint venture with a German publishing firm, Gruner + Jahr. In January 2008 the FT sold its 50% stake to its German partner. FT Deutschland never made a profit and is said to have accumulated losses of €250 million over 12 years. It closed on 7 December 2012. The Financial Times launched a new weekly supplement for the fund management industry on 4 February 2002. FT fund management (FTfm) was and still is distributed with the paper every Monday. FTfm is the world's largest-circulation fund management title. Since 2005 the FT has sponsored the annual Financial Times Business Book of the Year Award.

=== "Refreshed" FT ===
On 23 April 2007, the FT unveiled a "refreshed" version of the newspaper and introduced a new slogan, "We Live in Financial Times". In 2007 the FT pioneered a metered paywall, which let visitors to its website read a limited number of free articles during any one month before asking them to pay. Four years later the FT launched its HTML5 mobile internet app. Smartphones and tablets now drive 12% of subscriptions and 19% of traffic to FT.com. In 2012, the number of digital subscribers surpassed the circulation of the newspaper for the first time and the FT drew almost half of its revenue from subscriptions rather than advertising.

The FT has been available on Bloomberg Terminal since 2010 and on the Wisers platform since 2013. From 2015, instead of the metered paywall on the website, visitors were given unlimited free access for one month, after which they needed to subscribe. Pearson sold the Financial Times Group to Nikkei, Inc. for £844 million (US$1.32 billion) in July 2015.

In 2016, the Financial Times acquired a controlling stake in Alpha Grid, a London-based media company specialising in the development and production of quality branded content across a range of channels, including broadcast, video, digital, social and events. In 2018, the Financial Times acquired a controlling stake in Longitude, a specialist provider of thought leadership and research services to a multinational corporate and institutional client base. In January 2022, the FT completed the full acquisition of Longitude, buying out the remaining shares from co-founders Rob Mitchell, James Watson and Gareth Lofthouse. This investment built on the Financial Times' recent growth in several business areas, including conferences and events through FT Live and extends the FT's traditional commercial offering into a wider set of integrated services.

In 2020, reporter Mark Di Stefano resigned from the Financial Times after hacking into Zoom calls at other media organisations including The Independent and the Evening Standard. In 2020, the retraction of an opinion piece by a reporter for the Financial Times generated a controversy about the editorial independence of the paper from outside political pressure. The controversy followed the withdrawal by the newspaper's editor of an opinion piece by FT's Brussels correspondent Mehreen Khan that was critical of French President Emmanuel Macron's policy towards Muslim minorities in France. The piece was withdrawn from the FT website on the same day as its publication. President Macron subsequently published a letter in the FT directly responding to the arguments of the original opinion piece, even though the original opinion piece was no longer available on the website of the newspaper. The editor of the FT, Roula Khalaf, who took the decision to withdraw the initial article, acknowledged having been contacted by the Élysée Palace regarding the article, and defended her decision on the basis purely of several factual errors in the original piece by Mehreen Khan.

=== Wirecard exposé ===
In January 2019, the FT began a series of investigative articles detailing fraud suspicions at German payments group Wirecard. When the Wirecard share price plunged, German news media speculated that market manipulation was behind this attack on a German corporate, focusing on the lead author of the FT series, Dan McCrum. The public prosecutor's office in Munich subsequently launched an investigation. After the formal complaint of an investor, Wirecard and the German Federal Financial Supervisory Authority (BaFin), the responsible state's attorney announced investigations into several FT journalists.

On 22 June 2020, after 18 months of investigations and an external audit, Wirecard announced that €1.9 billion worth of cash reported in its accounts "may not exist". The company subsequently filed for insolvency. BaFin itself became subject of a European Securities and Markets Authority investigation for its response to the scandal.

=== Fossil fuel advertising ===
An investigation by The Intercept, The Nation, and DeSmog found that FT is one of the leading media outlets that publishes advertising for the fossil fuel industry. Journalists who cover climate change for FT are concerned that conflicts of interest with the companies and industries that caused climate change and obstructed action will reduce the credibility of their reporting on climate change and cause readers to downplay the climate crisis.

== Audience ==
According to the Global Capital Markets Survey, which measures readership habits among most senior financial decision makers in the world's largest financial institutions, the Financial Times is considered the most important business read, reaching 36% of the sample population, 11% more than The Wall Street Journal (WSJ), its main rival. The Economist, which was once 50% owned by FT, reaches 32%. FT's The Banker also proved vital reading, reaching 24%. In addition, in 2010 the FT was regarded as the most credible publication in reporting financial and economic issues among the Worldwide Professional Investment Community audience. The Economist was rated the third-most-credible title by most influential professional investors, while the WSJ was second.

In 2022, the FT launched FT Edit, a low-price app aimed at attracting a younger audience.

== Content ==
The FT is split into two sections. The first section covers domestic and international news, editorial commentary on politics and economics from FT journalists such as Martin Wolf, Gillian Tett and Edward Luce, and opinion pieces from globally renowned leaders, policymakers, academics and commentators.

The second section consists of financial data and news about companies and markets. Despite being generally regarded as primarily a financial newspaper, it does also contain TV listings, weather and other more informal articles. In 2021 and 2022, the outlet began focusing more on the cryptocurrency industry, launching a Digital Assets Dashboard, publishing multi-asset crypto indexes, starting a Cryptofinance newsletter dedicated to digital assets, and recruiting more journalists to cover the sector. About 110 of its 475 journalists are outside the United Kingdom.

=== The "Lex" column ===
The "Lex" column is a daily feature on the back page of the first section. It features analyses and opinions covering global economics and finance. The FT calls "Lex" its agenda-setting column. The column first appeared on Monday, 1 October 1945. The name may originally have stood for Lex Mercatoria, a Latin expression meaning literally "merchant law". It was conceived by Hargreaves Parkinson for the Financial News in the 1930s, and moved to the Financial Times when the two merged.

"Lex" boasts some distinguished alumni who have gone on to make careers in business and government—including Nigel Lawson (former Conservative Chancellor of the Exchequer), Richard Lambert (CBI director and former member of the Bank of England's monetary policy committee), Martin Taylor (former chief executive of Barclays), John Makinson (chairman and chief executive of Penguin), John Gardiner (former chairman of Tesco), David Freud (former UBS banker and Labour adviser, now a Conservative peer), John Kingman (former head of UKFI and a banker at Rothschild's), George Graham (RBS banker), Andrew Balls (head of European portfolio management at PIMCO) and Jo Johnson (former Conservative Member of Parliament for Orpington).

== FT Weekend ==
The FT publishes a Saturday edition of the newspaper titled the Financial Times Weekend. It consists of international economic and political news, Companies & Markets, Life & Arts, House & Home and FT Magazine.

=== FT Magazine ===
FT Magazine, also known as FT Weekend Magazine, is a supplement to the weekend edition. It is currently edited by Matt Vella. It is only included with the UK and Ireland edition of the Financial Times; however, articles from it are also printed in sections of the USA edition of the Financial Times, e.g. "Lunch with the FT". It is published on Saturdays and covers world events, politics and the arts. FT Magazine was founded in 2003. John Lloyd was the first editor of the magazine.

=== HTSI ===
HTSI (originally How to Spend It) is a weekly magazine published with FT Weekend. Founded and launched by Julia Carrick with Lucia van der Post as founding editor, its articles concern luxury goods such as yachts, mansions, apartments, horlogerie, haute couture and automobiles, as well as fashion and columns by individuals in the arts, gardening, food, and hotel and travel industries. How to Spend It started in 1967 as a one-page consumer goods feature in the newspaper, which was edited by Sheila Black, the FT's first female journalist, a former actress. To celebrate its 15th anniversary, FT launched the online version of this publication on 3 October 2009.

Some media commentators were taken aback by the online launch of a website supporting conspicuous consumption during the financial austerity of the late-2000s recession. The magazine has been derided in rival publishers' blogs, as "repellent" in the Telegraph and "a latter-day Ab Fab manual" in The Guardian. A "well-thumbed" copy of the supplement was found when rebel forces broke into Colonel Gaddafi's Tripoli compound during the 2011 Libyan Civil War.

In September 2021, an Arabic version of HTSI was launched by Othman Al Omeir, founder of Elaph online newspaper. HTSI Arabic is published in London.

The name of the magazine was changed in 2022 from How to Spend It to HTSI.

== Editorial stance ==
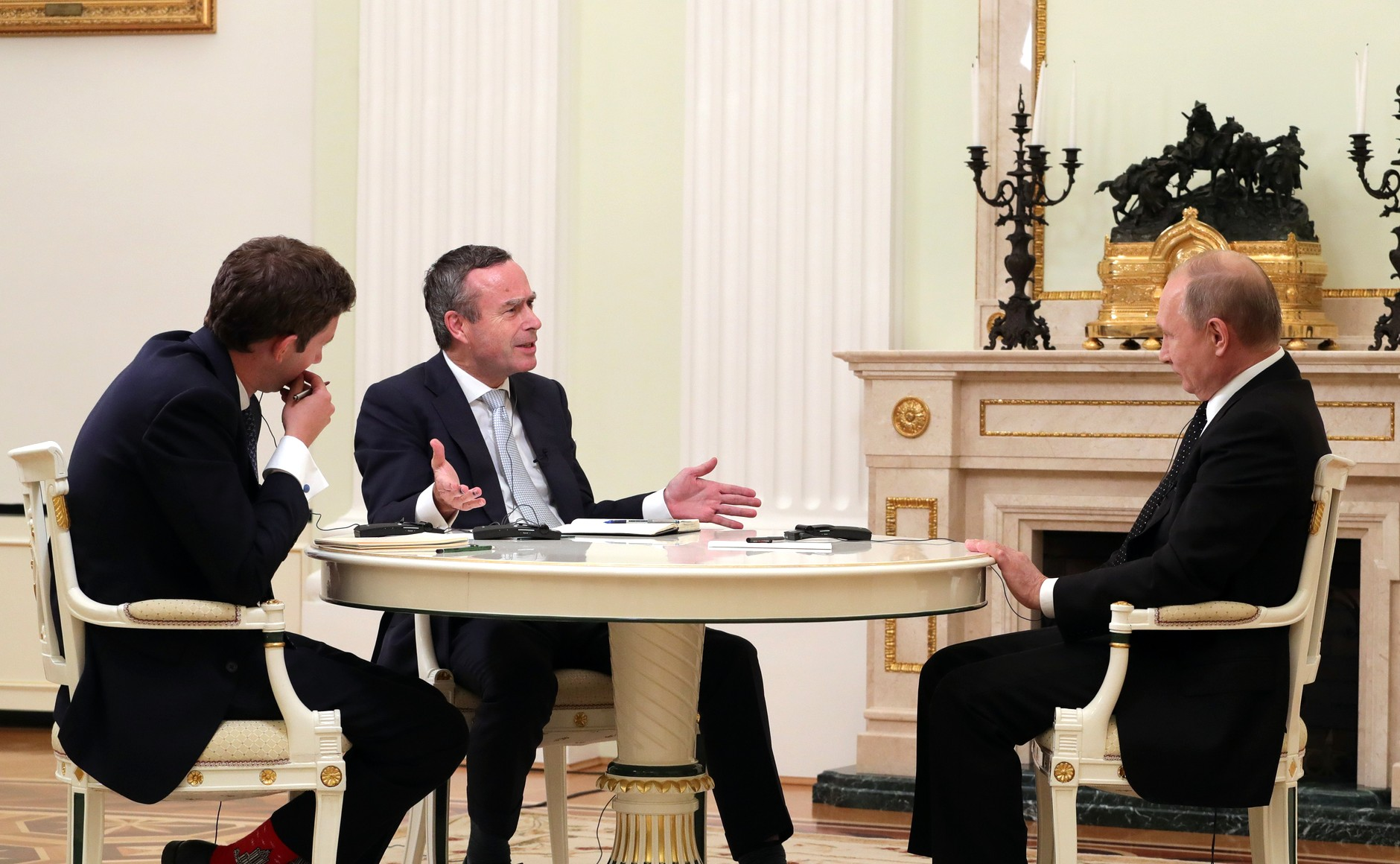
Russian president Vladimir Putin in controversial interview by Lionel Barber and Henry Foy of the Financial Times in 2019

The FT advocates free markets, and is in favour of globalisation. During the 1980s, it supported Margaret Thatcher and Ronald Reagan's monetarist policies. It has supported the UK Labour Party in the past, including at the general election in 1992 when Neil Kinnock was Labour leader. The FT's editorials tend to be pro-European. The FT was firmly opposed to the Iraq War. Due to its advocacy of free markets and free trade, it is often identified as centrist to centre-right in its political positions.

The modern FT is a product of a merger of two smaller newspapers in 1945; since that time, the paper had backed the Conservatives fairly consistently, but Labour's tacking to the centre, combined with the Conservatives' embrace of Euroscepticism, led the FT to reverse course and back Labour from 1992 until 2010, when the FT returned to the Conservative Party. Euroscepticism further drove a wedge between the FT and the Conservatives in 2019, when the paper refused to make an endorsement, opposed to Labour's socialist economic policies (for wanting to "reverse, not revise, the Thatcherite revolution of the 1980s") and the Conservatives' commitment to a hard Brexit.

In respect of the Russian invasion of Ukraine, FT commentator Martin Wolf expressed support for Ukraine. Two years before the invasion of Ukraine by Russia, the FT offered an interview to the Russian President Vladimir Putin. The interview received praise, as it offered an unusual access to the Russian leader's thinking. President Putin used the interview to state his opinions about the value of liberal democracy. The Ukrainian newspaper Kyiv Post accused the FT of asking President Putin softball questions, and said the interviewers failed to hold Putin to account.

=== United Kingdom politics ===
FT endorsements (1979–2024)
1979	Conservative
1983	Conservative
1987	Conservative
1992	Labour
1997	Labour
2001	Labour
2005	Labour
2010	Conservative
2015	Conservative
2017	Conservative
2019	No endorsement
2024	Labour

In the 2010 general election, the FT was receptive to the Liberal Democrats' positions on civil liberties and political reform, and praised the then Labour Party leader Gordon Brown for his response to the 2008 financial crisis, but on balance it backed the Conservatives, while questioning their tendency to Euroscepticism.

In the 2015 general election, the FT called for the continuation of the Conservative–Liberal Democrat coalition that had governed for the previous five years. In the 2017 general election, an FT editorial reluctantly backed Conservative Theresa May over Labour Jeremy Corbyn, while warning about her stance on immigration and the Eurosceptic elements in her party. The FT declared the 2019 general election a "fateful election" that "offers no good choices". In the 2024 general election, the FT endorsed the Labour Party again, expressing the need for a "fresh start", while cautioning "Labour's interventionist instincts and fervour for regulation".

=== United States politics ===
In the 2008 United States presidential election, the Financial Times endorsed Barack Obama. While it raised concerns over hints of protectionism, it praised his ability to "engage the country's attention", his calls for a bipartisan politics, and his plans for "comprehensive health-care reform". The FT favoured Obama again in the 2012 United States presidential election. The FT endorsed Democratic candidates Hillary Clinton in the run-up to the 2016 United States presidential election, Joe Biden in the 2020 United States presidential election, and Kamala Harris in the 2024 United States presidential election.

== Ownership and related publications ==
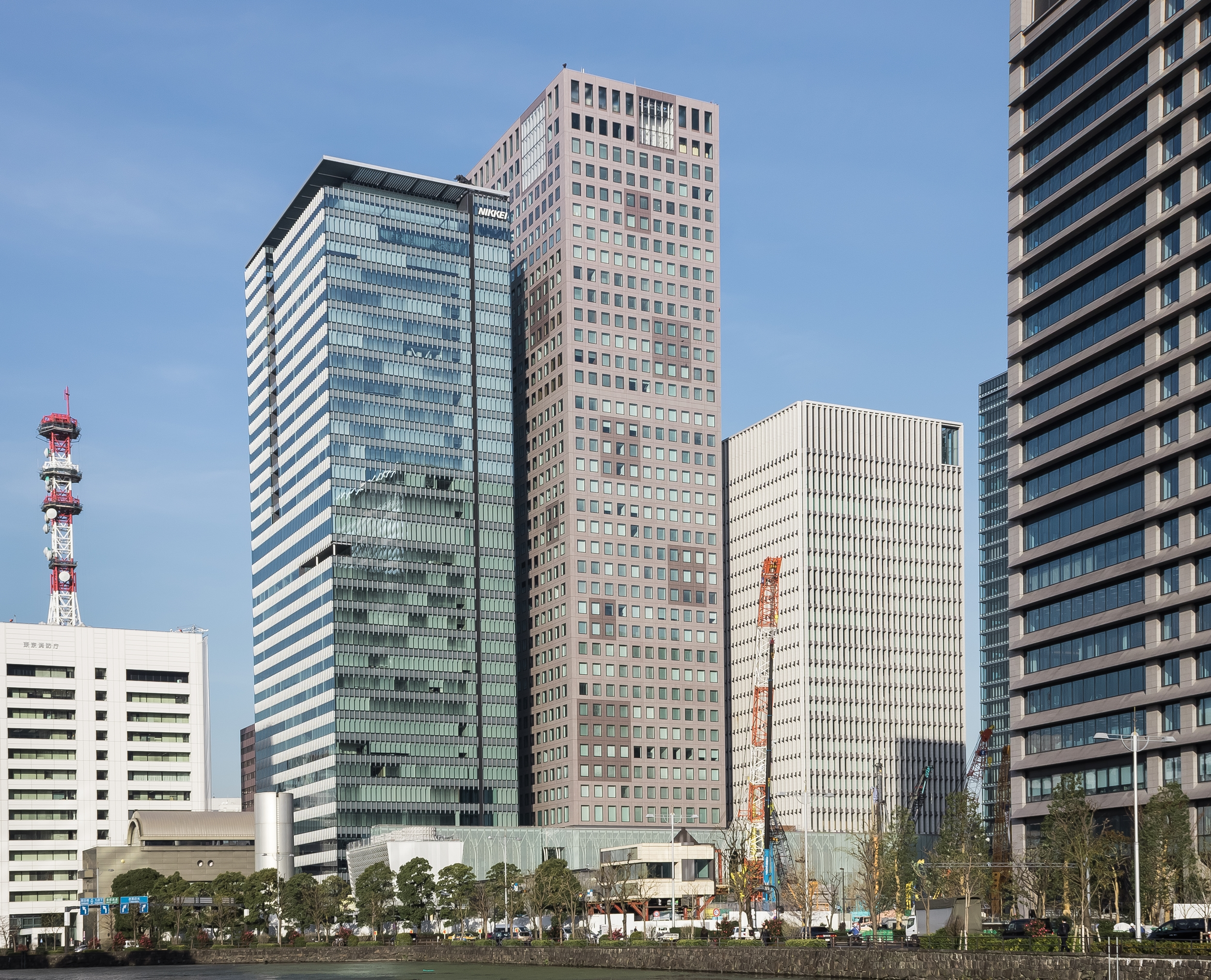
The FT has been owned by Nikkei since 2015; the Japanese holding company purchased the paper for £844m (US$1.32 billion).

On 23 July 2015, Nikkei, Inc. agreed to buy the Financial Times Group, a division of Pearson plc since 1957, for £844m (US$1.32 billion) and the acquisition was completed on 30 November 2015. Under the transaction agreement, Pearson retained the publishing rights to FT Press and licensed the trademark from Nikkei. Until August 2015 the FT group had a 50% shareholding in The Economist, which was sold to the Agnelli family for £469 million. Related publications include the Financial Times, FT.com, FT Search Inc., the publishing imprint FT Press and numerous joint ventures. In November 2013 it agreed to sell Mergermarket, an online intelligence reporting business, to the London private equity investor BC Partners. In addition, the FT Group has a unit called FT Specialist, which is a provider of specialist information on retail, personal and institutional finance segments. It publishes The Banker, Money Management and FT Adviser (a publication targeted to the financial intermediary market), fDi Intelligence and Professional Wealth Management (PWM). In 2023, FT Specialist acquired a majority stake in medical publisher Endpoints News.

The Financial Times Group announced the beta launch of newssift, part of FT Search, in March 2009. Newssift.com is a next-generation search tool for business professionals that indexes millions of articles from thousands of global business news sources, not just the FT. The Financial Times Group acquired Money Media (an online news and commentary site for the industry) and Exec-Appointments (an online recruitment specialist site for the executive jobs market). The FT Group once had a 13.85% stake in Business Standard Ltd of India, the publisher of the Business Standard. It sold this stake in April 2008 and has entered into an agreement with Network 18 to launch the Financial Times in India, though it is speculated that they may find it difficult to do so, as the brand 'Financial Times' in India is owned by The Times Group, the publisher of The Times of India and The Economic Times. The group also publishes America's Intelligence Wire, a daily general newswire service.

The Financial Times' Financial Publishing division (formerly FT Business) provides print and online content for retail, personal and institutional finance audiences. Examples of publications and services include: Investors Chronicle, a personal finance magazine and website; "FT Money", a weekly personal finance supplement in "FT Weekend"; FT Wealth, a magazine for the global high-net-worth community and FTfm, a weekly review of the global fund management industry, Money Management and FT Adviser. The institutional segment includes: The Banker, This Is Africa, fDi Intelligence and Professional Wealth Management (PWM). Money-Media, a separate arm of Financial Publishing, delivers a range of digital information services for fund management professionals around the globe, including: Ignites, Ignites Europe, Ignites Asia, FundFire and BoardIQ. Financial Publishing includes publications (Pensions Expert and Deutsche Pensions & Investmentnachrichten) and events (Investment Expert) for the European pensions industry. The group also publishes MandateWire, a financial information company that provides sales and market intelligence for investment professionals in North America, Europe and Asia.

FT Knowledge is an associated company which offers educational products and services. FT Knowledge has offered the "Introducing the City" course (which is a series of Wednesday night lectures and seminars, as well as weekend events) during each autumn and spring since 2000. FT Predict is an editorial service on forecasted economic events hosted by the Financial Times that allows users to buy and sell contracts based on future financial, political and news-driven events by spending fictional Financial Times Dollars (FT$). Based on the assumptions displayed in James Surowiecki's The Wisdom of Crowds, this contest allows people to use forecasted economic events to observe future occurrences while competing for weekly and monthly prizes.

The Financial Times also ran a business-related game called "In the Pink" (a phrase meaning "in good health", also a reference to the colour of the newspaper and to the phrase "in the red" meaning to be making a loss). Each player was put in the virtual role of Chief Executive and the goal was to have the highest profit when the game closes. The winner of the game (the player who makes the highest profit) was to receive a real monetary prize of £10,000. The game ran from 1 May to 28 June 2006.

In 2019, the Financial Times announced it was investing in Sifted, a digital-only news site and newsletter covering European startups. The Financial Times' initial 25% stake was subsequently diluted to 14% due to later investments from others. This marked the start of a planned 7-year strategic relationship with Sifted.

== Indices ==
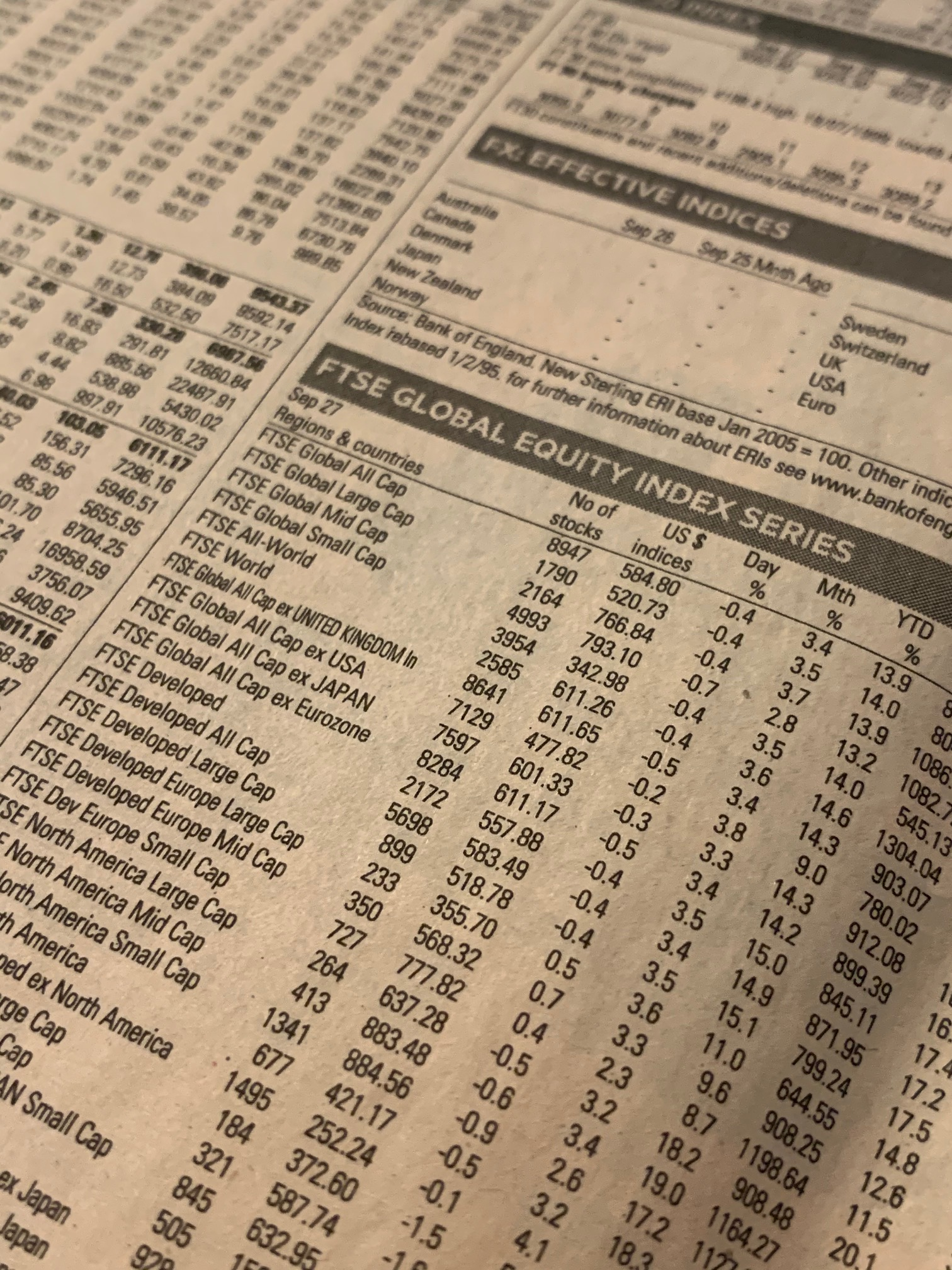
A selection of FT market indices, 2019

The Financial Times collates and publishes a number of financial market indices, which reflect the changing value of their constituent parts. The longest-running of these was the former Financial News Index, started on 1 July 1935 by the Financial News. The FT published a similar index; this was replaced by the Financial News Index — which was then renamed the Financial Times (FT) Index — on 1 January 1947. The index started as an index of industrial shares, and companies with dominant overseas interests were excluded, such as the Anglo-Iranian Oil Company (later BP), British-American Tobacco, Lever Brothers (later Unilever) and Shell. The oil and financial sectors were included decades later.

The FTSE All-Share Index, the first of the FTSE series of indices, was created in 1962, comprising the largest 594 UK companies by market capitalisation. The letters F-T-S-E represented that FTSE was a joint venture between the Financial Times (F-T) and the London Stock Exchange (S-E). On 13 February 1984, the FTSE 100 was introduced, representing about eighty per cent of the London Stock Exchange's value. FTSE Group was made an independent company in 1995. The first of several overseas offices was opened in New York City in 1999; Paris followed in early 2000, Hong Kong, Frankfurt and San Francisco in 2001, Madrid in 2002 and Tokyo in 2003.

Other well-known FTSE indices include the FTSE 350 Index, the FTSE SmallCap Index, the FTSE AIM UK 50 Index and FTSE AIM 100 Index as well as the FTSE AIM All-Share Index for stocks, and the FTSE UK Gilt Indices for government bonds.

In 2021, the Financial Times started publishing three multi-asset indexes with Wilshire Associates covering combinations of the top five cryptocurrencies.

In June 2021, Wilshire Advisors partnered with the FT, renaming their Wilshire 5000 US total stock market index to the FT Wilshire 5000 index and launching a new series of FT Wilshire indices. In 2023, Wilshire Advisors spun-out its indexing business into a new corporation, Wilshire Indexes, owned by Wilshire Advisors, the FT, Singapore Exchange, and later also Nikkei, Inc. In March 2026, Wilshire Indexes went into administration, and the FT Wilshire 5000 index series was reacquired by Wilshire Advisors. The FT cobranding was subsequently dropped.

== People ==
In July 2006, the FT announced a "New Newsroom" project to integrate the newspaper more closely with FT.com. At the same time it announced plans to cut the editorial staff from 525 to 475. In August 2006 it announced that all the required job cuts had been achieved through voluntary layoffs. A number of former FT journalists have gone on to high-profile jobs in journalism, politics and business. Robert Thomson, previously the paper's US managing editor, was the editor of The Times and is now the chief executive of News Corporation. Will Lewis, a former New York correspondent and News Editor for the FT, edited The Daily Telegraph and The Wall Street Journal. Dominic Lawson went on to become editor of the Sunday Telegraph until he was dismissed in 2005. Andrew Adonis, a former education correspondent, became an adviser on education to the then British Prime Minister, Tony Blair, and was given a job as an education minister and a seat in the House of Lords after the 2005 election. Ed Balls became chief economic adviser to the Treasury, working closely with Gordon Brown, the chancellor of the exchequer, before being elected a Member of Parliament in 2005, and became Secretary of State for Children, Schools and Families in July 2007.

Bernard Gray, a former defence correspondent and "Lex" columnist, was chief executive of the publishing company CMP before becoming chief executive of TSL Education, publisher of the Times Educational Supplement. David Jones, at one time the FT's Night Editor, then became Head of IT. He was a key figure in the newspaper's transformation from hot metal to electronic composition and then onto full-page pagination in the 1990s. He went on to become Head of Technology for the Trinity Mirror Group.

Sir Geoffrey Owen was the editor of the Financial Times from 1981 to 1990. He joined the Centre for Economic Performance (CEP) at the London School of Economics as Director of Business Policy in 1991 and was appointed Senior Fellow, Institute of Management, in 1997. He continues his work there. During his tenure at the FT, he had to deal with rapid technological change and issues related to it, for example repetitive strain injury (RSI), which affected dozens of FT journalists, reporters and staff in the late 1980s.

== Editors ==
1889: Douglas MacRae
1890: W. R. Lawson
1892: Sydney Murray
1896: A. E. Murray
1909: C. H. Palmer
1924: D. S. T. Hunter
1937: Archibald Chisholm
1940: Albert George Cole
1945: Hargreaves Parkinson
1949: Sir Gordon Newton
1973: Fredy Fisher
1981: Geoffrey Owen
1991: Richard Lambert
2001: Andrew Gowers
2006: Lionel Barber
2020: Roula Khalaf

== See also ==
- Business journalism
- Financial Times Business Book of the Year Award
- Financial Times Person of the Year
- List of newspapers in the United Kingdom
- Periodical literature
- TNW (website)
