= Investors Chronicle =

Weekly magazine in the United Kingdom

Investors' Chronicle
- Editor: Rosie Carr
- Categories: Personal finance
- Frequency: Weekly
- Total circulation: 30,935 (2016)
- First issue: 9 June 1860
- Company: Financial Times
- Country: United Kingdom
- Language: English
- Website: www.investorschronicle.co.uk
- ISSN: 2052-725X

The Investors' Chronicle is a weekly magazine in the United Kingdom for private investors and is published by the Financial Times Group. The magazine publishes articles about global markets and sectors, and news on corporate actions such as takeovers and share issues. It was established in 1860, and has been considered a "highly influential magazine".

== History ==
The Investors' Chronicle was first published on 9 June 1860 as the Money Market Review. In 1914, it merged with the Investor's Chronicle and Journal of Finance. In 1928, publication was taken over by Brendan Bracken. In 1967, the Investors Chronicle merged with the Stock Exchange Gazette. And in 1978, it re-established its connection with the Financial Times, by becoming part of the FT Group. It is now published by FT Specialist, part of FT Group, which is owned by Japanese media group Nikkei.

== Content ==
Investors' Chronicle is edited by Rosie Carr and has a staff of 30 journalists. Their names are listed in the people panel in the magazine. The magazine focuses on coverage of companies in the FTSE 100, 250, 350 and 500 as well as companies listed on the Alternative Investment Market (AIM).

== Editors ==
- Geoffrey J. Holmes (before 1914–1937)
- Harold Wincott (1938–1959)
- John Cobb
- Andreas Whittam Smith (1970–1977)
- Michael Brett (1977-1982)
- Gillian O'Connor (1982–1994)
- ?
- Ceri Jones (1996–2002)
- Matthew Vincent (2002–?)
- Oliver Ralph (2007–2009)
- Jonathan Eley (2009–2012)
- John Hughman (2012–2021)
- Rosie Carr (2021–)
