= List of companies of the Netherlands =

Location of the Netherlands

The Netherlands is the main constituent country of the Kingdom of the Netherlands. It is a densely populated country located in Western Europe with three island territories in the Caribbean. The European part of the Netherlands borders Germany to the east, Belgium to the south, and the North Sea to the northwest, sharing maritime borders with Belgium, the United Kingdom, and Germany. The three largest cities in the Netherlands are Amsterdam, Rotterdam and The Hague. The port of Rotterdam is the world's largest port outside East Asia, and by far the largest port in Europe.

The Netherlands has a market-based mixed economy, ranking 17th of 177 countries according to the Index of Economic Freedom. It had the thirteenth-highest per capita income in the world in 2013 according to the International Monetary Fund.The Netherlands has a long and significant commercial history and is now a high-income economy.

For further information on the types of business entities in this country and their abbreviations, see "Business entities in Netherlands".

== Largest firms ==
This list shows firms in the Fortune Global 500, which ranks firms by total revenues reported before March 31, 2017. Only the top five firms (if available) are included as a sample.

Rank	Image	Name	2016 revenues (US$M)	Employees	Notes
7		Shell plc	240,033	89,000	Multinational oil and gas "supermajor." Regional divisions include Shell Oil Company (US), Shell Australia, Shell Canada, Shell Nigeria, and Shell Pakistan. Functional subsidiaries include Shell Chemicals and Shell Gas & Power.
20		Exor	154,894	302,562	Investment holding company based in Amsterdam, but controlled by the Agnelli family of Italy. Held investments include significant stakes in Fiat Chrysler Automobiles (UK), CNH Industrial (UK), and Ferrari (Italy).
94		Airbus	73,628	133,782	Multinational corporation that manufacturers and designs aerospace products, including civil and military divisions. Note: registered headquarters is in Netherlands, "head office" is in France.
147		Aegon N.V.	58,789	29,380	Hague-based multinational life insurance, pensions and asset management company. Subsidiaries include Transamerica Corporation (US), Aegon UK, and Aegon Life Insurance Company.
163		ING Group	55,282	51,943	The Internationale Nederlanden Groep is an Amsterdam-based multinational financial services firm which provides retail banking, direct banking, commercial banking, investment banking, asset management, and insurance to more than 48 million customers worldwide.

== Notable firms ==
This list includes notable companies with primary headquarters located in the country. The industry and sector follow the Industry Classification Benchmark taxonomy. Organizations which have ceased operations are included and noted as defunct.

Notable companies Status: P=Private, S=State; A=Active, D=Defunct
Name	Industry	Sector	Headquarters	Founded	Notes	Status	
Aalberts	Industrials	Electrical components & equipment	Utrecht	1981	Installations, climate controls	P	A
Abellio	Transport	Bus, ferry and train services	Utrecht	2001	Public transport	P	A
ABN AMRO	Financials	Banks	Amsterdam	1991	Bank	P	A
Accell Group	Consumer goods	Recreational products	Heerenveen	1998	Bicycles	P	A
Adyen	Financials	Payments industry	Amsterdam	2006	Payment processor	P	A
Aegon N.V.	Financials	Life insurance	The Hague	1983	Life insurance	P	A
Ahold Delhaize	Consumer services	Food retailers & wholesalers	Zaandam	2016	Food retailer	P	A
AkzoNobel	Basic materials	Specialty chemicals	Amsterdam	1994	Chemicals, paints, coatings	P	A
APM Terminals	Industrials	Transportation services	The Hague	2001	Part of Maersk (Denmark)	P	A
Apollo Vredestein B.V.	Consumer goods	Automobile parts	Amsterdam	1909	Tires	P	A
Arcadis	Industrials	Engineering	Amsterdam	1888	Engineering consultancy	P	A
ASM International	Industrials	Industrial machinery	Almere	1968	Equipment for semiconductor fabrication	P	A
ASML Holding	Industrials	Industrial machinery	Veldhoven	1984	Photolithography equipment	P	A
ASN Bank	Financials	Banks	The Hague	1960	Bank	P	A
Atradius	Financials	Non-life insurance	Amsterdam	1925	Trade credit insurances	P	A
AVEBE	Consumer goods	Food products	Veendam	1919	Starch	P	A
Besi	Industrials	Industrial machinery	Duiven	1995	Semiconductor equipment	P	A
Beter Bed	Consumer services	Specialty retailers	Uden	1981	Furniture	P	A
Blendle	Technology	Internet	Utrecht	2013	Online news platform	P	A
Boskalis	Maritime services	Offshore construction	Papendrecht	1910	Dredging, offshore transport and installation	P	A
Brabantia	Consumer goods	Household furnishings	Valkenswaard	1916	Food storage and preparation items, waste bins, laundry racks	P	A
Catawiki	Technology	Internet	Amsterdam	2008	Online auction	P	A
Chipshol	Real estate	Real estate investment and services	Amsterdam	1986	Development company	P	A
CNH Global	Industrials	Commercial vehicles	Amsterdam	1999	Defunct 2013	P	D
Corendon Dutch Airlines	Consumer services	Airlines	Lijnden	2010	Airline	P	A
DAF Trucks	Consumer goods	Automobiles	Eindhoven	1993	Trucks	P	A
Damen Group	Industrials	Industrial transportation & defense	Gorinchem	1927	Shipbuilder	P	A
Dockwise	Industrials	Marine transportation	Breda	1993	Shipping	P	D
Douwe Egberts	Consumer goods	Soft drinks	Utrecht	1753	Coffee, tea	P	A
DSM	Basic materials	Specialty chemicals	Heerlen	1902	Nutrition, materials	P	A
eBuddy	Technology	Internet	Amsterdam	2003	Messaging	P	A
Elsevier	Consumer services	Publishing	Amsterdam	1880	Publisher	P	A
Endemol	Consumer services	Broadcasting & entertainment	Amsterdam	1994	Television, part of Apollo Global Management (US), defunct 2015	P	D
Endemol Shine Group	Consumer services	Broadcasting & entertainment	Amsterdam	2015	Television, part of the Walt Disney Company and Apollo Global Management (both US), defunct 2020	P	D
Exact Software	Technology	Software	Delft	1984	Financial software	P	A
Exor	Financials	Investment services	Amsterdam	1927	Investment firm	P	A
Feadship	Consumer goods	Recreational products	Haarlem	1949	Luxury yacht manufacturer	P	A
FRABA	Industrials	Industrial automation	Heerlen	1918	Sensors for motion control	P	A
FrieslandCampina	Consumer goods	Food products	Amersfoort	2008	Dairy	P	A
Fugro	Oil & gas	Exploration & production	Leidschendam	1962	Surveyors	P	A
G-Star Raw	Consumer goods	Apparel retailers	Amsterdam	1989	Clothing	P	A
General Logistics Systems	Industrials	Delivery services	Amsterdam	1999	Logistics	P	A
Heerema Marine Contractors	Oil & gas	Oil equipment & services	Leiden	1948	Support services	P	A
Heineken International	Consumer goods	Brewers	Amsterdam	1864	Brewery	P	A
HEMA	Consumer goods	Variety	Amsterdam	1926	Variety and housewares	P	A
High-Logic	Technology	Software	De Bilt	1997	Font software	P	A
Hunter Douglas	Industrials	Building	Rotterdam	1919	Window blindings	P	A
IKEA	Consumer services	Home improvement retailers	Leiden	1942	Home goods	P	A
ING Group	Financials	Banks	Amsterdam	1991	Financial services	P	A
Interxion	Technology	Computer services	Schiphol-Rijk	1998	Data centre services	P	A
IPTP Networks	Telecommunications	Fixed line telecommunications	Amsterdam	1996	Telecom, ISP	P	A
Jumbo	Consumer goods	Food retailers & wholesalers	Veghel	1921	Food retailer	P	A
KLM	Consumer services	Airlines	Amstelveen	1919	Part of Air France-KLM (France)	P	A
KPMG	Industrials	Business support services	Amstelveen	1987	Auditors	P	A
KPN	Telecommunications	Fixed line telecommunications	The Hague	1852	Telecom	P	A
Kyboe	Consumer goods	Fashion watches	The Hague	2007	Wristwatches	P	A
Leerdammer	Consumer goods	Food products	Schoonrewoerd	1974	Cheese, part of Lactalis (France)	P	A
Liander	Utilities	Conventional electricity	Arnhem	2008	Electrical distributor	P	A
Martinair	Consumer services	Airlines	Haarlemmermeer	1958	Airline	P	A
Nederlandse Spoorwegen	Industrials	Railroads	Utrecht	1938	State railways	S	A
NN Group	Financials	Full line insurance	The Hague	1963	Insurance	P	A
Nuon Energy	Utilities	Multiutilities	Amsterdam	1995	Electricity, gas, heat. Part of Vattenfall	P	A
Nutricia	Consumer goods	Food products	Amsterdam	1896	Part of Danone (France)	P	A
NXP Semiconductors	Technology	Semiconductors	Eindhoven	2006	Semiconductors and electronics	P	A
Océ	Technology	Electronic office equipment	Venlo	1877	Copiers, printers	P	A
Odido	Telecommunications	Telecommunications services	The Hague	2023	Mobile telecommunications	P	A
OMA	Industrials	Business support services	Rotterdam	1975	Architecture	P	A
Perfetti Van Melle	Consumer goods	Food products	Lainate/Breda	2001	Confectionary	P	A
Philips	Consumer goods	Consumer electronics	Amsterdam	1891	Electronics	P	A
PostNL	Industrials	Delivery services	The Hague	1998	Postal services	P	A
Prosus	Technology	Consumer digital services	Amsterdam	2019	Part of Naspers (South Africa)	P	A
Rabobank	Financials	Banks	Utrecht	1972	Financial services	P	A
Randstad NV	Industrials	Business support services	Diemen	1960	HR consulting	P	A
Royal BAM Group	Industrials	Heavy construction	Bunnik	1869	Construction	P	A
Royal Imtech N.V.	Industrials	Electrical components & equipment	Gouda	1860	Manufacturing, defunct 2015	P	D
Royal Schiphol Group	Industrials	Transportation services	Schiphol	1916	Operator of airports and airport terminals	P	A
Royal Van Oord	Industrials	Heavy construction	Rotterdam	1868	Marine engineering and construction	P	A
SBM Offshore	Oil & gas	Oil equipment & services	Schiedam	1965	Oil systems and services	P	A
SenseGlove	Technology	Computer hardware	Delft	2017	Haptic gloves for VR	P	A
SHV Holdings	Industrials	Diversified industrials	Utrecht	1896	Trading	P	A
SPAR	Consumer goods	Food retailers & wholesalers	Amsterdam	1932	Food retailer	P	A
Stellantis	Consumer goods	Automobiles	Hoofddorp	2021	Automotive	P	A
Stork B.V.	Industrials	Aerospace	Naarden	1868	Aerospace support	P	A
Talpa Network	Consumer services	Broadcasting & entertainment	Hilversum	2004	Television, social media, multimedia	P	A
Tele2 Netherlands	Telecommunications	Fixed line telecommunications	Amsterdam	1993	Telecom	P	A
Telfort	Telecommunications	Mobile telecommunications	Alphen aan den Rijn	1997	Mobile, part of KPN	P	A
Thales Nederland	Industrials	Defense & electronics	Hengelo	1922	Part of Thales Group (France)	P	A
TMF Group	Industrials	Financial administration	Amsterdam	1988	Accounting	P	A
TNT Express	Industrials	Delivery services	Hoofddorp	2011	Part of PostNL	P	A
TomTom	Technology	Software	Amsterdam	1991	Navigation software	P	A
Tony's Chocolonely	Consumer goods	Food products	Amsterdam	2005	Confectionery	P	A
Transavia	Consumer services	Airlines	Haarlemmermeer	1965	Airline	P	A
Triodos Bank	Financials	Banks	Zeist	1980	Bank	P	A
Trust	Technology	Computer hardware	Dordrecht	1981	Computer peripherals	P	A
TUI fly Netherlands	Consumer services	Airlines	Schiphol-Rijk	2005	Airline	P	A
UNStudio	Industrials	Business support services	Amsterdam	1988	Architecture	P	A
Vanguard Dutch Marine	Consumer goods	Recreational products	Heerenveen	2008	Luxury yacht manufacturer	P	A
VDL Bus & Coach	Industrials	Commercial vehicles	Valkenswaard	1993	Bus manufacturing, part of VDL Groep	P	A
VDL NedCar	Consumer goods	Automobile	Born	1967	Part of VDL Groep	P	A
Vedior	Industrials	Business training & employment agencies	Amsterdam	1998	Staffing	P	A
Verenigde Nederlandse Uitgeverijen	Consumer services	Publishing	Haarlem	1964	Publisher	P	A
Vitol	Energy	Oil, gas & coal	Rotterdam	1966	Commodity trading	P	A
VodafoneZiggo	Telecommunications	Fixed line and mobile telecommunications	Maastricht	1995	Joint venture between Liberty Global and Vodafone (UK)	P	A
VolkerWessels	Industrials	Heavy construction	Amersfoort	1854	Construction	P	A
Wavin	Industrials	Building materials & fixtures	Zwolle	1955	Pipes	P	A
WE	Consumer goods	Apparel retailers	Utrecht	1917	Clothing	P	A
Wercker	Technology	Software	Amsterdam	2011	Application frameworks	P	A
Wolters Kluwer	Industrials	Business support services	Alphen aan den Rijn	1836	Publisher and information services	P	A
Zeeman	Consumer goods	Apparel retailers	Alphen aan den Rijn	1967	Clothing	P	A

== See also ==
- Economy of the Netherlands
