= Sébastien Buemi =

Swiss racing driver (born 1988)

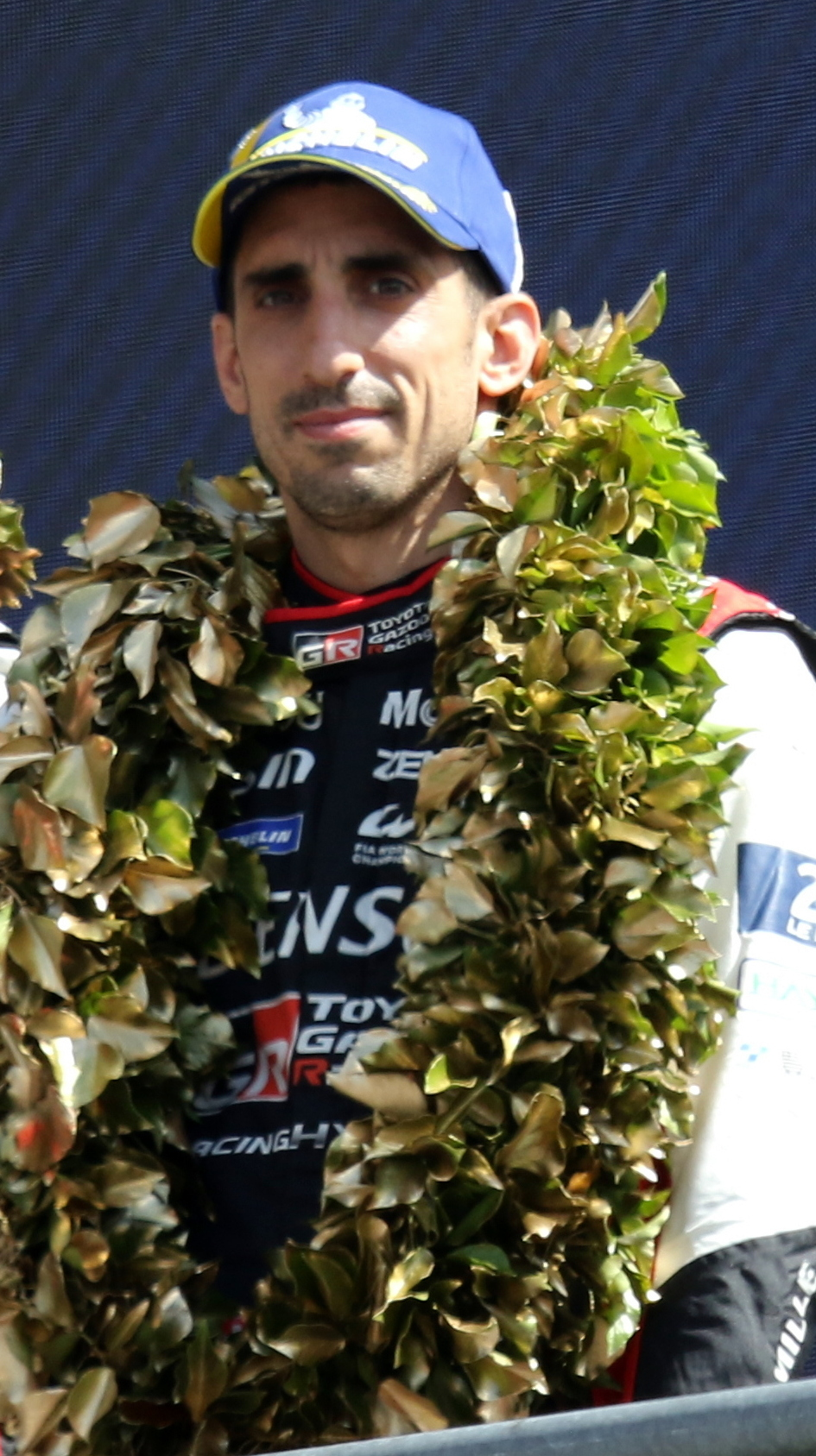
- Buemi at the 2023 24 Hours of Le Mans
- Born: Sébastien Olivier Humbert Buemi; 31 October 1988 (age 38); Aigle, Vaud, Switzerland
- Spouse: Jennifer (m. 2015)
- Children: 3
- Relatives: Natacha Gachnang (cousin)

FIA World Endurance Championship career
- Debut season: 2012
- Current team: Toyota Racing
- Categorisation: FIA Platinum
- Car number: 8
- Starts: 101
- Championships: 5 (2014, 2018–19, 2022, 2023, 2026)
- Wins: 29
- Podiums: 58
- Poles: 13
- Fastest laps: 11
- Best finish: 1st in 2014, 2018–19 (LMP1), 2022, 2023 (HY)

Formula E career
- Debut season: 2014–15
- Teams: Renault, Nissan, Envision Racing-Jaguar
- Car number: 9 (2014–2018); 23 (2018–2022); 16 (2022–2026)
- Starts: 160
- Championships: 1 (2015–16)
- Wins: 14
- Podiums: 36
- Poles: 17
- Fastest laps: 10

Formula One World Championship career
- Nationality: (Switzerland) Swiss
- Active years: 2009–2011
- Team: Toro Rosso
- Entries: 55
- Championships: 0
- Wins: 0
- Podiums: 0
- Career points: 29
- Pole positions: 0
- Fastest laps: 0
- First entry: 2009 Australian Grand Prix
- Last entry: 2011 Brazilian Grand Prix

24 Hours of Le Mans career
- Years: 2012–2024
- Teams: Toyota
- Best finish: 1st (2018, 2019, 2020, 2022)
- Class wins: 4 (2018, 2019, 2020, 2022)

Sébastien Olivier Humbert Buemi (French pronunciation: [sebastjɛ̃ ɔlivje œ̃bɛʁ bɥemi]; born 31 October 1988) is a Swiss racing driver with experience in Formula One, Formula E and the FIA World Endurance Championship. In endurance racing, Buemi has competed in the LMP1 / Hypercar class of the World Endurance Championship for Toyota Racing since 2012. He has won a joint-record five World Endurance Championship titles tied with Brendon Hartley (2014, 2018–19, 2022 and 2023), and is a four-time winner of the 24 Hours of Le Mans (2018. 2019, 2020 and 2022.

In formula racing, Buemi competed in Formula One for Toro Rosso from 2009 to 2011. Then he spent 12 seasons in Formula E with teams Renault e.dams, Nissan e.dams and Envision. Buemi won the championship in 2015–16 and was runner-up in 2016–17 and 2018–19. He is joint second for all-time wins, tied with António Félix da Costa and behind only Mitch Evans, as well as third for all-time podiums.

== Early career ==
=== Formula BMW ===
Born in Aigle, Vaud, Buemi graduated from karting and spent 2004 and 2005 in German Formula BMW, finishing third and second in the championship respectively. He was also runner up in the 2005 FBMW World Final.

=== Formula Three ===
Following a single race in Spanish Formula Three in 2005, Buemi moved up to the Formula Three Euroseries for 2006, finishing 12th in the championship, ceding 11th place to Charlie Kimball on countback. He remained in the series for 2007, and finished second in the championship, behind Romain Grosjean. He has also competed in the special Masters of Formula 3 and Macau Grand Prix races.

=== A1 Grand Prix ===
For the 2006–07 A1 Grand Prix season, Buemi shared driving duties for A1 Team Switzerland with Neel Jani and Marcel Fässler. The team finished eighth in the championship.

=== GP2 Series ===
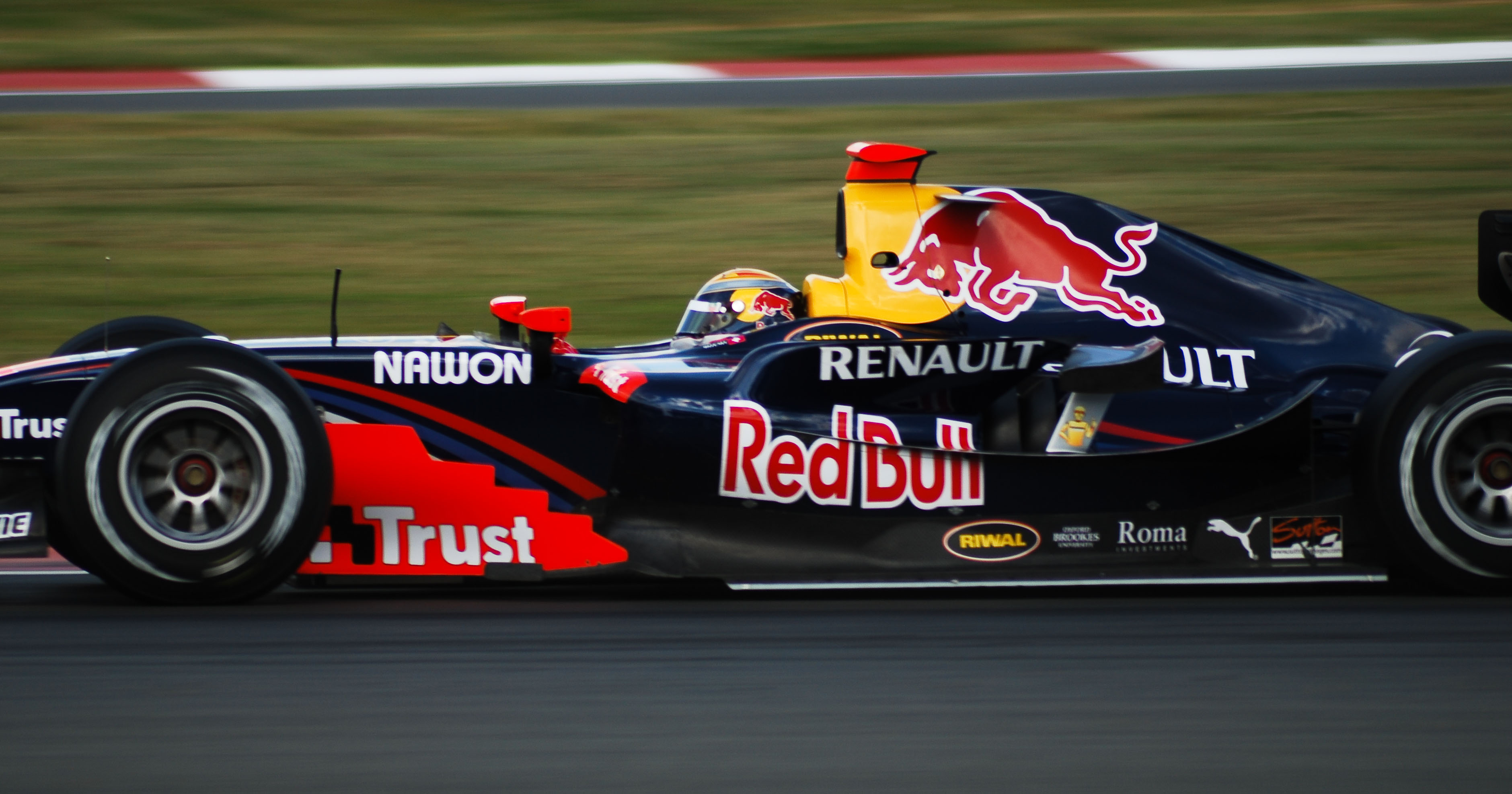
Buemi driving for Arden International at the Silverstone round of the 2008 GP2 Series season

Buemi was drafted in at short notice to replace the injured Michael Ammermüller at ART Grand Prix for the Monaco round of the 2007 GP2 Series season. He performed creditably on his GP2 début, qualifying fourth and finishing seventh. He joined the Arden International team for the 2008 GP2 Asia Series, and finished as runner-up with a win and four second places. He continued with the team for the main 2008 season. He scored his first win in the French sprint race, starting 21st on the grid (after a technical problem in the feature race) on slick tyres on a drying track and benefitting as most rivals had to pit for slicks. He won one more race and ended the season sixth in the championship.

== Formula One ==
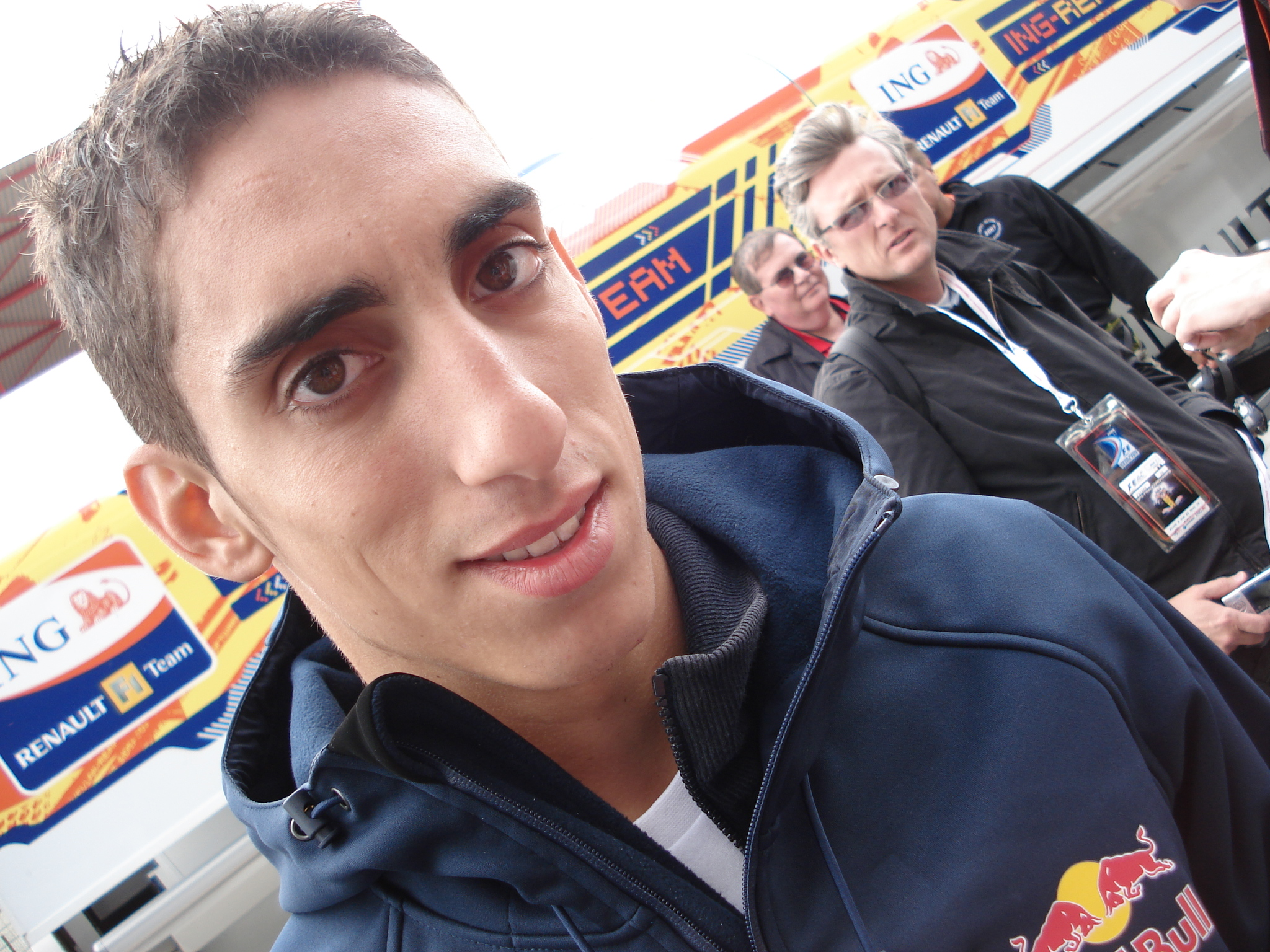
Buemi in 2008

On 18 September 2007, Buemi drove the Red Bull RB3 at the F1 test session in Jerez. He was third quickest on the day, behind Timo Glock (BMW) and Vitantonio Liuzzi (Scuderia Toro Rosso) but ahead of names such as Rubens Barrichello (Honda) and Nelson Piquet Jr. (Renault). On 16 January 2008, Red Bull Racing confirmed Buemi as their test and reserve driver for the 2008 season. At the 2008 Japanese Grand Prix, Buemi drove the medical car as usual driver Dr. Jacques Tropenat had been suffering from an ear problem. Buemi also drove the medical car at the Chinese Grand Prix and Brazilian Grand Prix.

=== Scuderia Toro Rosso (2009–2011) ===
==== 2009 ====
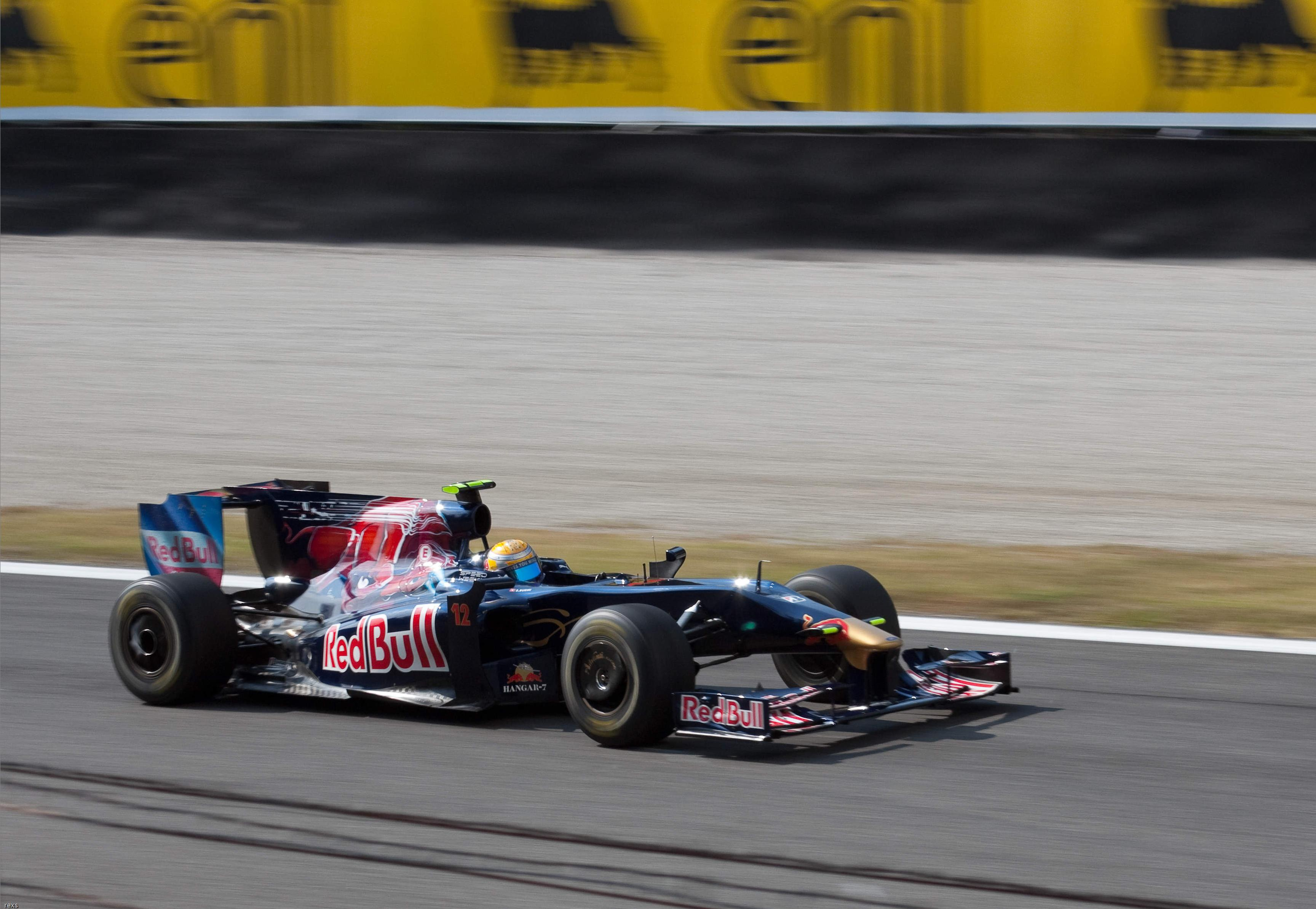
Buemi driving for Toro Rosso at the 2009 Italian Grand Prix

Scuderia Toro Rosso confirmed its signing of Buemi as one of its race drivers on 9 January 2009. He was the first Swiss driver to take part in an F1 race since Jean-Denis Délétraz drove for Pacific at the 1995 European Grand Prix.

In his first race, the 2009 Australian Grand Prix, Buemi outqualified his teammate Sébastien Bourdais and then scored a point in the race by finishing in eighth position. He was later promoted to seventh place as a result of Lewis Hamilton being disqualified. At the Chinese Grand Prix, he scored another point, this time in the wet, finishing eighth after starting tenth. After a mid season dip in the Toro Rosso's form, Buemi rounded off a good weekend to finish seventh in the 2009 Brazilian Grand Prix. He followed this with a third top ten qualification in a row and another points finish at the season finale in Abu Dhabi. Buemi finished the year sixteenth with six points as the best rookie.

==== 2010 ====
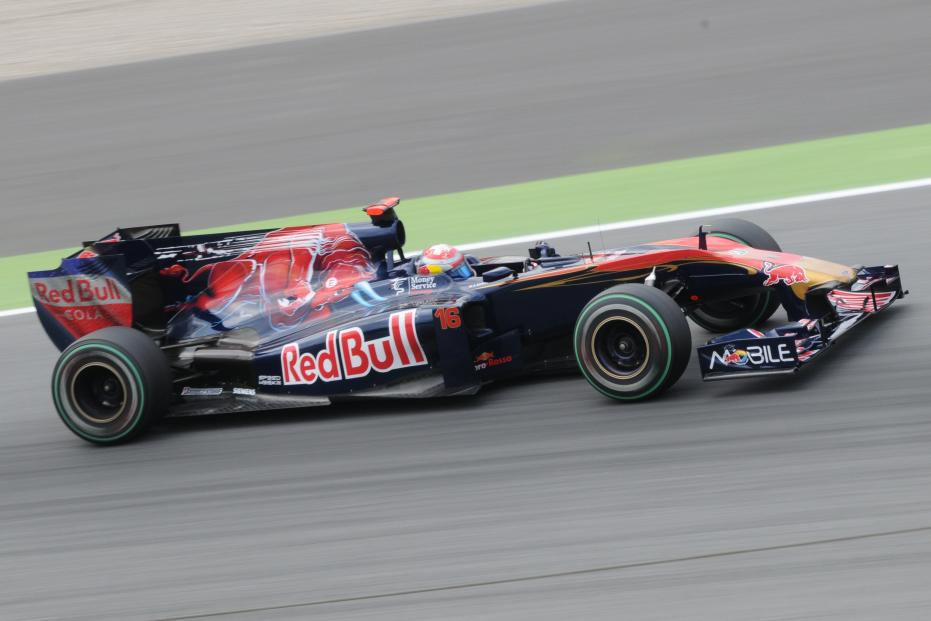
Buemi driving the Toro Rosso STR5 during practice for the 2010 Spanish Grand Prix

On 9 November 2009, it was confirmed that Buemi would race for a second season with Toro Rosso.

During the first free practice session of the 2010 Chinese Grand Prix, a front suspension wishbone broke under braking on Buemi's Toro Rosso as he braked for Turn 14. The two front wheels flew off while Buemi was travelling at over 300 km/h (190 mph). One wheel went over the safety fence and landed in a spectator area, missing a camera man on its way. Buemi's car continued to travel forward, veering to the left and sliding along an Armco barrier, knocking off the front wing. Neither Buemi nor any spectators were injured as a result of the incident. Toro Rosso blamed a failure of a new front right upright for the incident. Buemi completed 2010 with eight points to teammate Alguersuari's five. He was sixteenth again in the drivers' championship.

==== 2011 ====
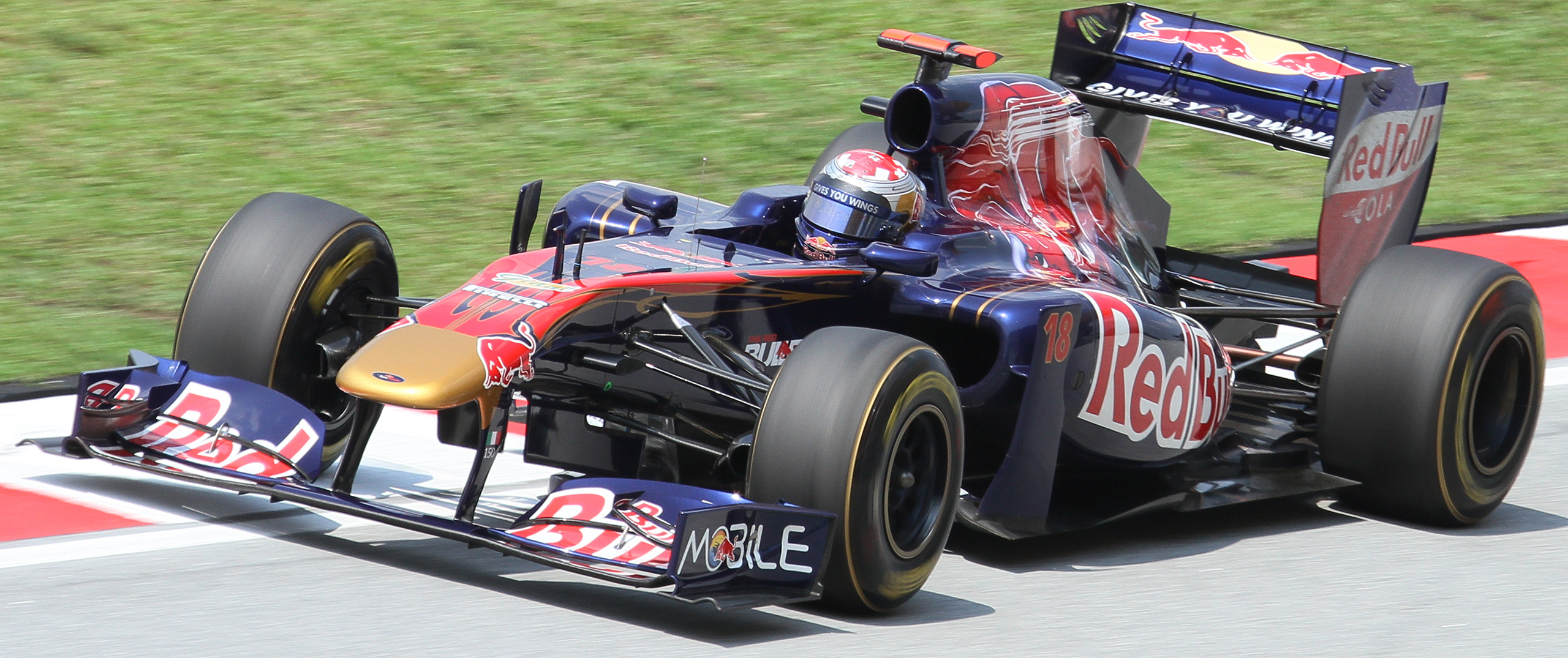
Buemi driving for Toro Rosso at the 2011 Malaysian Grand Prix

Buemi, along with his teammate from 2009 and 2010 – Jaime Alguersuari, continued to race for Scuderia Toro Rosso in 2011. On 14 December 2011, it was announced that both Buemi and Alguersuari had been dropped by the team, and would be replaced by Daniel Ricciardo and Jean-Éric Vergne for the 2012 season.

=== Red Bull Racing (2012–2022) ===
==== 2012 ====
In January 2012, it was announced that Buemi would rejoin Red Bull Racing as a test and reserve driver for the 2012 season, as well as acting as Toro Rosso's reserve driver. Buemi continued as Red Bull's test and reserve driver for the 2013 and 2014 seasons. Buemi was again announced as reserve driver for 2019 for Red Bull Racing. He participated in the 2020 Young Driver's Test with the Milton Keynes squad. As of 2023, Buemi was not featured on Red Bull's list of reserve drivers.

== FIA World Endurance Championship ==
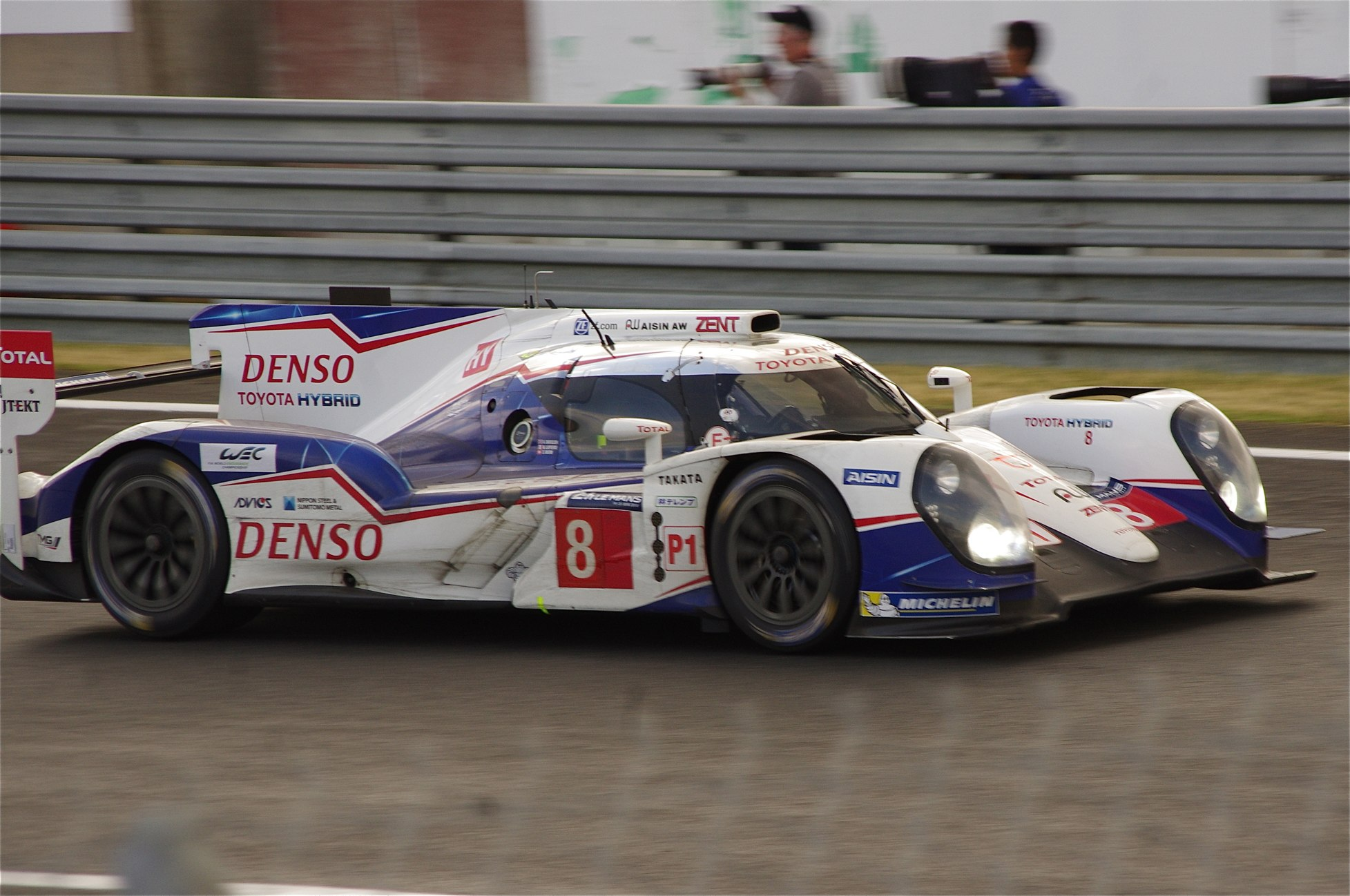
The Toyota TS040 Hybrid that Buemi drove at the 2014 24 Hours of Le Mans

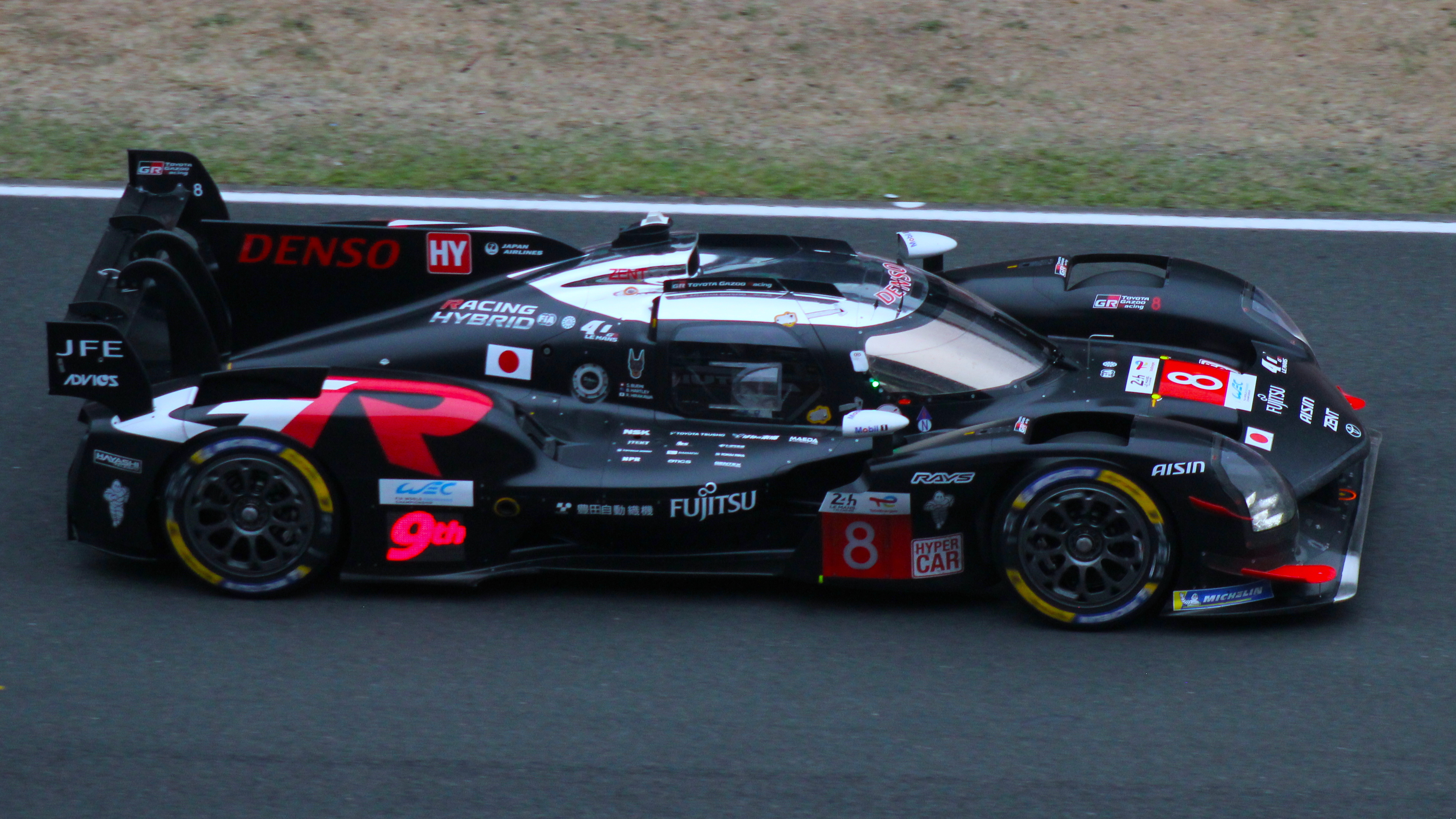
Buemi's No. 8 car at the 2025 24 Hours of Le Mans

Buemi also signed a deal to contest the 24 Hours of Le Mans with Toyota Motorsport GmbH, driving a Toyota TS030 Hybrid with Anthony Davidson and Hiroaki Ishiura (who later withdrew and was replaced by Stéphane Sarrazin). After a strong performance, the car was running in third position in the early evening when Davidson collided with a GT Ferrari and crashed heavily.

In 2013, Buemi continued driving with Toyota for a full season and ended with third place in the drivers' championship. For the 2014 season, he drove Toyota's new car – the Toyota TS040 Hybrid. With four wins and seven podiums from the eight races, Buemi became World Endurance Drivers' Champion with teammate Anthony Davidson.

As of 2024, Buemi has won the FIA WEC four times and won the 24 Hours of Le Mans four times and is the only FIA World Endurance Championship driver to have remained loyal to the same team and manufacturer since 2012.

== Formula E ==
Buemi is currently one of the most successful drivers in the series' history having claimed many wins, poles, fastest laps and points in the series.

=== Renault e.dams (2014–2018) ===
Buemi raced in the inaugural Formula E season for e.dams alongside Frenchman Nicolas Prost.

==== 2014–15 season ====
Buemi's season did not start off easily with a retirement in Beijing having started from last on the grid and being unable to set a qualifying time at the following round in Putrajaya, he lined up 19th on the grid. Buemi drove a brilliant recovery race having started in 19th and finishing third on the podium ahead of his teammate who started in 11th. At the third round of the season, Buemi secured his first race victory in Punta del Este. Buemi started on pole at the following round in Buenos Aires for the first time in his career but crashed out of the race after leading. Buemi went on to win in Monaco and the first London race, both from pole position, whereas he finished second in Berlin. Buemi finished the season second in the championship, one point short of Nelson Piquet Jr.'s tally.

==== 2015–16 season ====
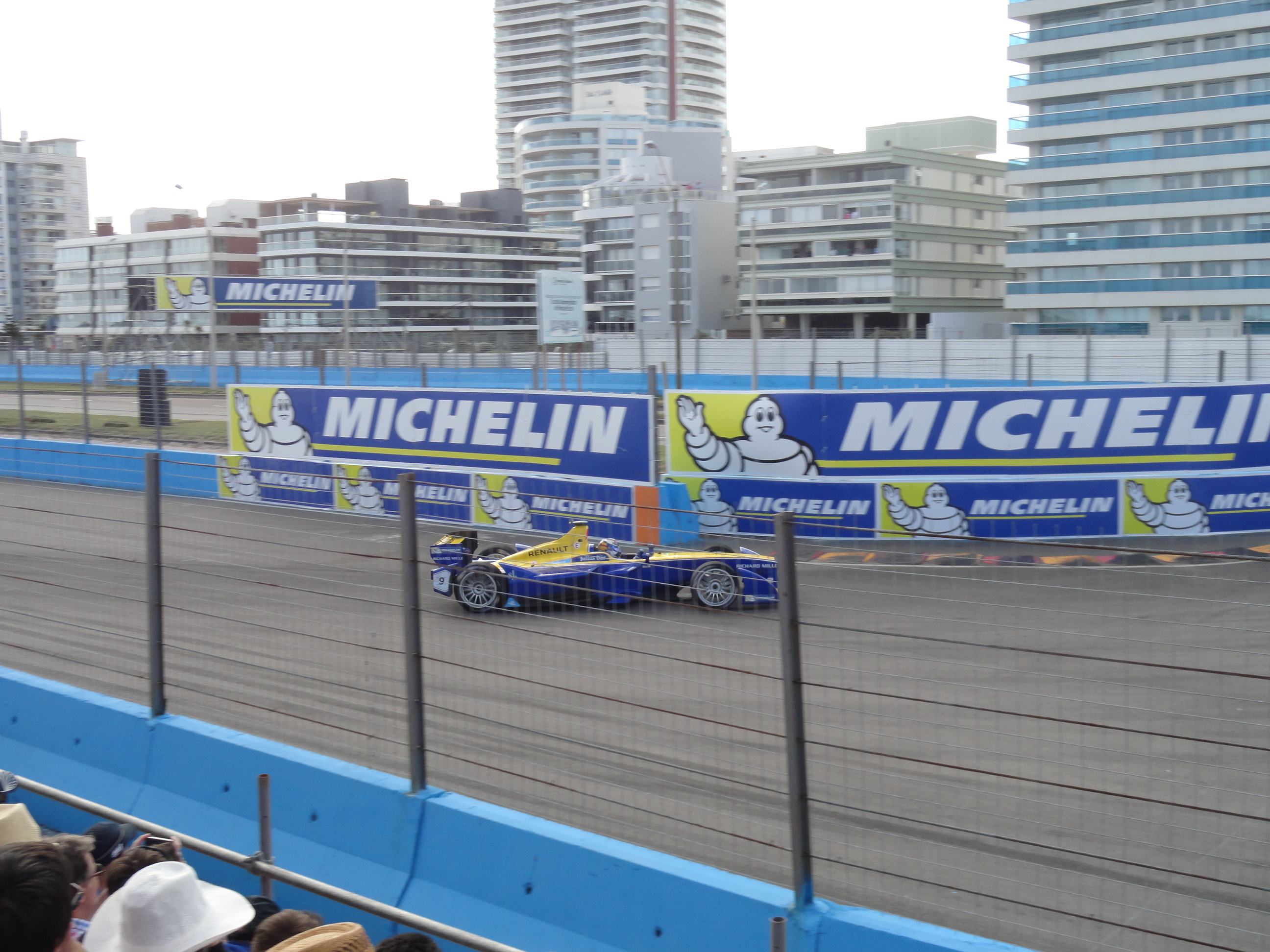
Buemi at the 2015 Punta del Este ePrix

In season two, Buemi dominated the early stages of the championship. In the season opening round in Beijing Buemi secured pole, fastest lap and the race win. The story was looking much the same in the following round in Putrajaya before Buemi's car experienced mechanical failure while leading the race. Having made a mistake in qualifying in Punta del Este, Buemi lined up fifth on the grid, but went on to claim his third fastest lap in three races and another race victory. Next he finished second in Buenos Aires and Mexico.

After a third-place finish at Paris, Buemi scored his third win of the season at Berlin, setting up a nail-biting finale in London. With Buemi needing to finish ahead of rival Lucas di Grassi to win the championship in the second race of the weekend, he was hit off by no other than di Grassi himself at the first corner. As a result, the championship would be decided by whichever driver could secure the fastest-lap bonus point in their respective second car. Despite the immense pressure, Buemi cruised to the fastest lap to became the 2015–16 Formula E champion.

==== 2016–17 season ====
Season three started exceptionally well for Buemi, as he won the first three rounds of the championship, becoming the first Formula E driver to achieve the feat of three consecutive wins. Buemi would go on to take three more wins at Monaco, Paris, and Berlin before the final four races in New York City and Montreal, both double headers.

However, Buemi skipped the New York event due to his WEC commitments with Toyota and participated in the 6 Hours of Nürburgring instead, with Red Bull F1 test and reserve driver Pierre Gasly taking his place. In addition, he was disqualified from two races for technical infringements. Ultimately, this loss of points led to Buemi missing out on the championship as rival Lucas di Grassi took the title at the final race.

==== 2017–18 season ====
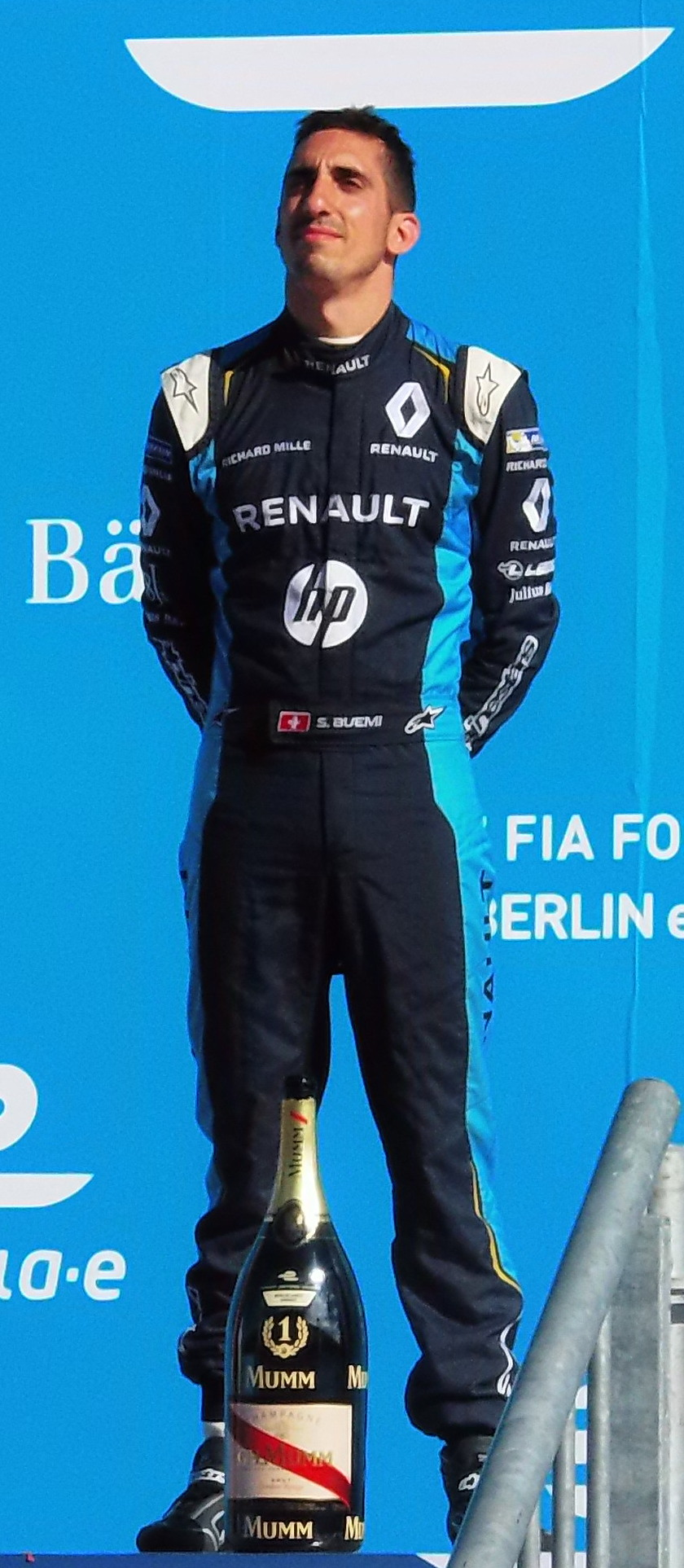
Buemi on the podium at the 2017 Berlin ePrix

Buemi endured a tough start to the season, taking only one point from the opening double-header at Hong Kong, having been involved in some incidents, including with previous seasons' title rival Lucas di Grassi. Buemi hit back with pole position at Marrakesh. He led the race throughout until four laps from the finish, when he was passed by the Mahindra of Felix Rosenqvist. He achieved two podium finishes at the next two races, to leave him in fourth place in the standings. However, he crashed out of the following race in Punta del Este. His Renault e.dams, however, proved not to be as competitive as previous seasons, and while consistently scoring in the points, he did not achieve a race win or podium for the next four races. In the final ePrix of the season, a double-header at New York, Buemi qualified on pole in both rounds, with the final round being achieved in the first wet qualifying session in Formula E history. However, he would slip behind faster cars in the races to third and fourth respectively. This meant he finished the season in fourth place, his lowest position in the standings since Formula E began, with 125 points. Renault e.dams finished the season fifth in the standings, the first time they had not won the Teams' Championship, with Buemi scoring 125 out of the team's 133 points.

=== Nissan e.dams (2018–2022) ===
It was announced that the DAMS would switch from Renault to Nissan from the 2018-19 season. Buemi was initially meant to partner Alexander Albon, who raced for the DAMS Formula 2 team, but he was released by DAMS to join Buemi's former team, Toro Rosso to race in F1 in 2019. Albon was replaced by Oliver Rowland, who had previously raced for DAMS in Formula 2 in 2017.

==== 2018–19 season ====
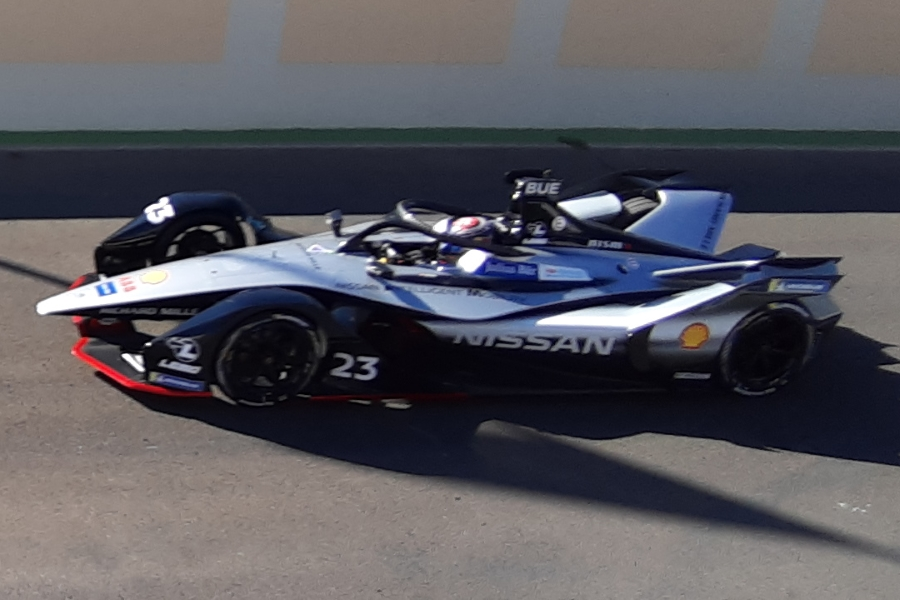
Buemi at the 2019 Marrakesh ePrix

Buemi started the season with third place on the grid, but slipped to sixth by the end of the race. At the next round in Marrakesh, Buemi again started third on the grid, but had to avoid the spinning Techeetah of Jean-Éric Vergne and fell down the order. However, by the end of the race, he recovered to eighth place. At the next race, in Santiago, he inherited pole position when Lucas di Grassi was disqualified for a technical infringement. However, he crashed out of lead towards the end of the race due to a brake failure. Buemi's misfortune continued, when at the next race, both he and his teammate Rowland ran out of energy a lap before the end of the race, running in fourth and third respectively, after Nissan had miscalculated the number of laps remaining. This was followed by a suspension failure causing him to retire from the following round. At the next round he crashed during his superpole run and therefore qualified sixth, but he was later disqualified for a technical infringement and had to start from the pit lane. By the last lap, he had made his way up to eighth place, but while attempting to overtake Robin Frijns, Buemi ploughed into the back of him, causing Frijns to take out di Grassi, moving Buemi up to sixth, while di Grassi retired on the spot, and Frijns limped back home in 14th. Buemi was given a ten-second time penalty for causing the collision and was classified eighth, the position he was in before the crash. He also had trouble in Rome and Paris. However, after taking pole for the Berlin ePrix, his results improved. He finished second, after di Grassi overtook him and won the race. In Bern, and in Race 2 in New York, he finished third. His first victory of the season came in Race 1 in New York, after taking pole position. He was under attack from Jaguar driver Alex Lynn. However, Lynn retired due to a loss of power. After that, Buemi held a comfortable margin to win the race over Lynn's teammate, Mitch Evans, who had an incredible comeback from 13th position on the grid. By the end of the season, Buemi had overtaken eleven drivers, including title contenders Evans and di Grassi, to climb from 13th to second in the championship.

==== 2019–20 season ====
Buemi and Oliver Rowland were retained by Nissan e.dams for the 2019–20 season. Buemi finished fourth in the championship standings.

==== 2020–21 season ====
Nissan e.dams retained Buemi and Oliver Rowland for the 2020–21 season.

==== 2021–22 season ====
Buemi continued with Nissan e.dams with Maximilian Günther as his new teammate in 2022. The season once again failed to yield any podiums for Buemi, who scored a best result of fifth in New York City, which put him 15th in the standings.

=== Envision Racing (2023–2026) ===
==== 2022–23 season ====
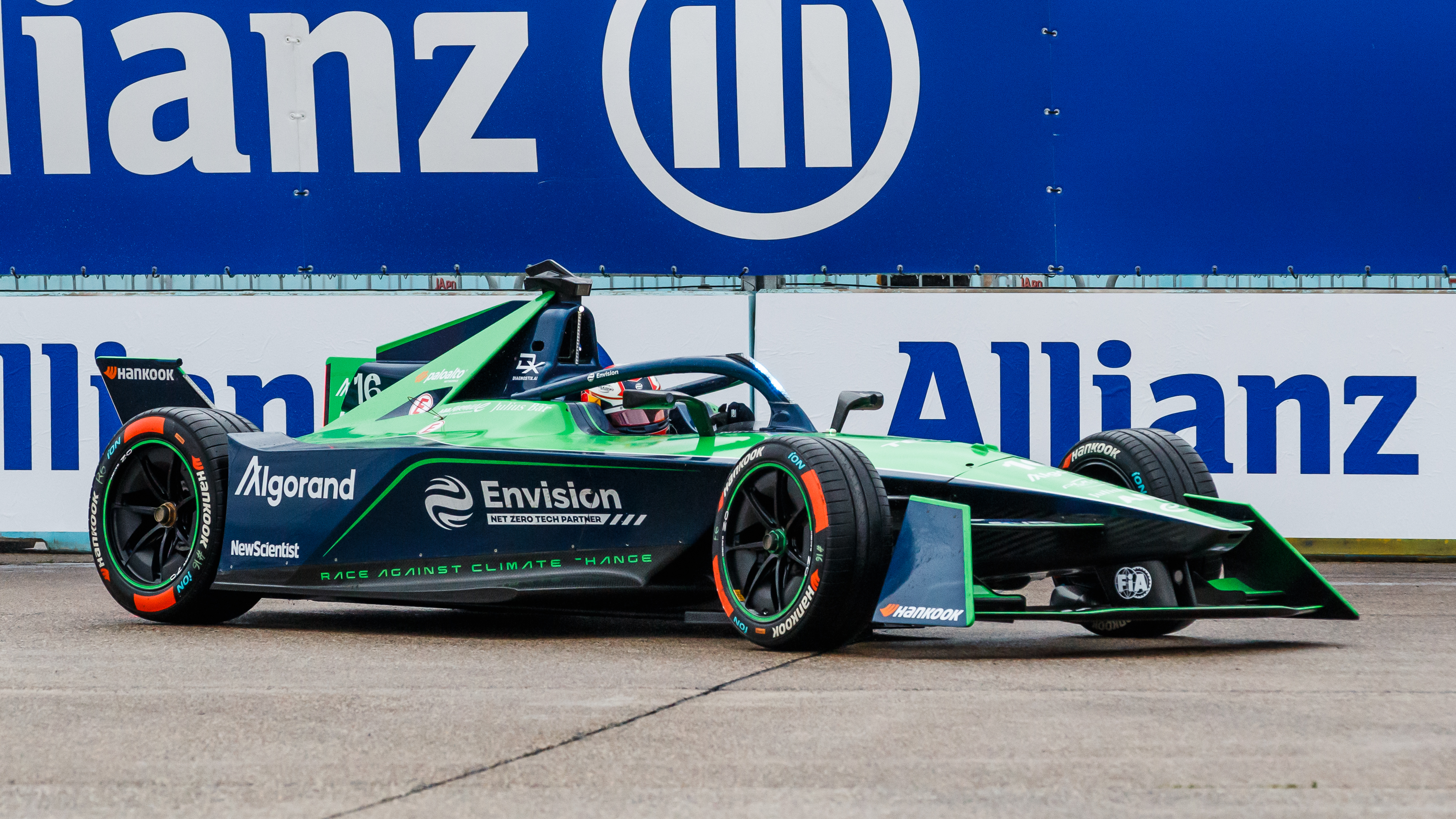
Buemi at the 2023 Berlin ePrix.

In October 2022, Buemi announced that he would switch to the Envision Racing team, replacing the outgoing Robin Frijns and partnering Nick Cassidy, under a two-year deal. Additionally, he ended an eight-year association with e.dams, which started in his first Formula E season. Having finished sixth during the season opener in Mexico City, Buemi scored his first pole position since the 2019 New York City ePrix weekend in Diriyah, having beaten rookie Jake Hughes in the final stage of qualifying. He took points from both races in the Kingdom, ending up fourth and sixth respectively. At the Hyderabad ePrix, Buemi navigated through a chaotic race to cross the line in third position, however he would be demoted to 15th due to an overpower infringement. More misery would pile on during the opening lap of the next race in Cape Town, as the Swiss driver was hit by a late-braking Pascal Wehrlein going into Turn 10. What followed would be a recovery drive with a damaged car, in which Buemi brought his Envision back up to fifth place.

==== 2023–24 season ====
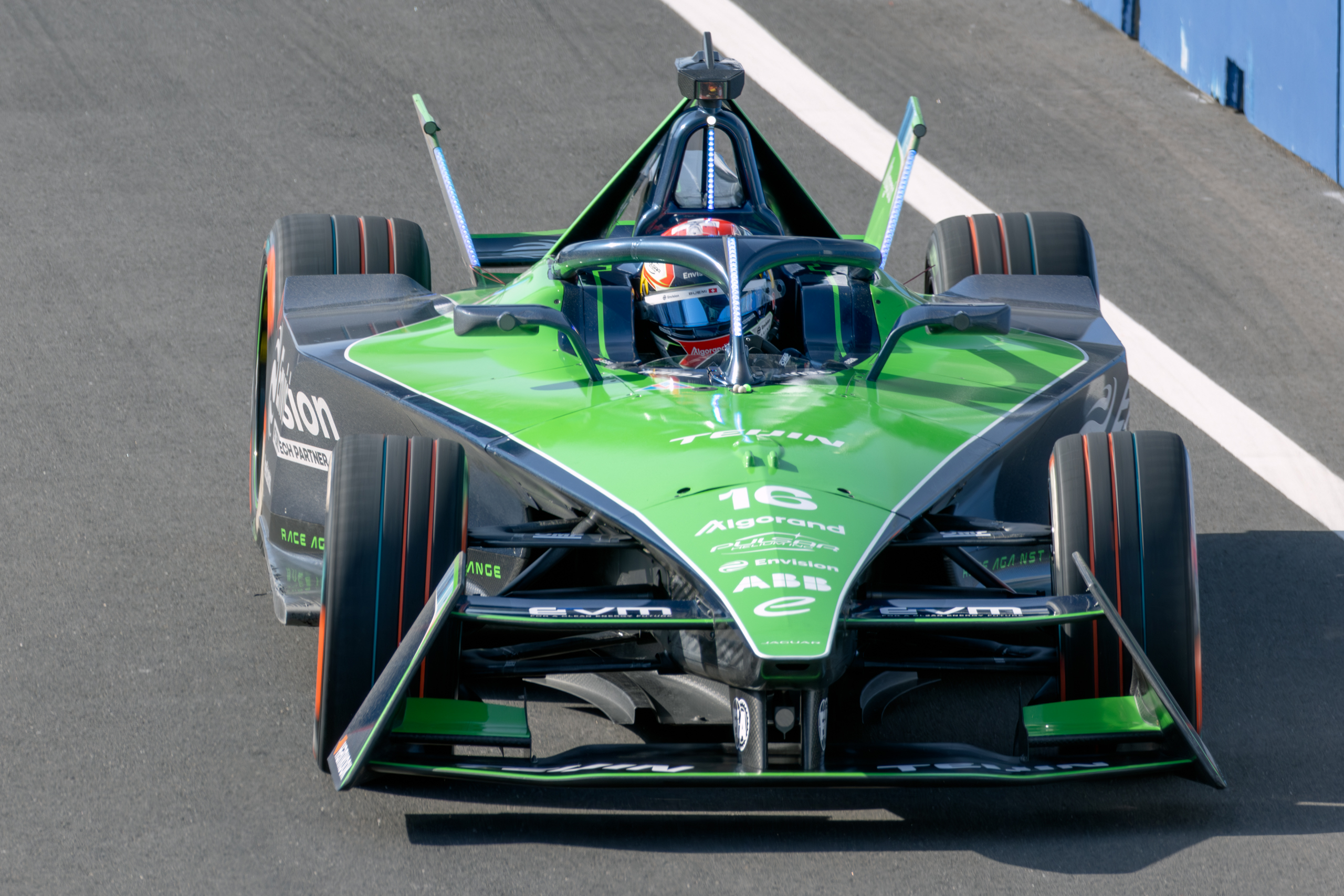
Buemi at the 2024 Tokyo ePrix

Buemi remained at Envision Racing for the 2023–24 season as part of his contract, having Robin Frijns as his new teammate as Nick Cassidy departed for Jaguar Racing.

==== 2024–25 season ====
Buemi and Robin Frijns continued with Envision Racing for the 2024–25 season.

==== 2025–26 season ====
In August 2025, Buemi penned a multi-year deal with Envision Racing, extending his deal to drive for the team during the 2025–26 season.

Prior to the London ePrix, Buemi announced his retirement from Formula E at the end of the season, opting to fully focus on his FIA World Endurance Championship career with Toyota. However, he will remain at Envision as he takes up an advisory role.

== Personal life ==
As of 2009, Buemi resided in Bahrain with his family and his girlfriend Jennifer. He then resided in Monaco for some time, and has since returned to Switzerland. Buemi married Jennifer in 2015, and they have three sons together. His grandfather Georges Gachnang and his first cousin Natacha Gachnang are also racing drivers.

In 2013, Buemi and Johnny Herbert mentored six contestants in a primetime ITV4 reality series, with the aim of taking players of the Gran Turismo videogames to the Dubai 24 Hour race as real drivers. Other countries in Europe had heats mentored by Vitantonio Liuzzi.

== Karting record ==
=== Karting career summary ===
Season	Series	Team	Position
1998	KIA Cup — Mini		12th
1998	Swiss Championship — Mini		1st
1999	KIA Cup — Mini 90		1st
1999	Swiss Championship — Mini 90		1st
2002	Andrea Margutti Trophy — ICA Junior		2nd
2002	Grand Prix Karting FFSA — Junior		9th
2002	Italian Open Masters — ICA Junior		2nd
2002	European Championship — ICA Junior	Cegga Karts Racing	1st
2002	Monaco Kart Cup — ICA Junior	Cegga Karts Racing	17th
2003	South Garda Winter Cup — ICA Junior		20th
2003	Andrea Margutti Trophy — ICA Junior	Intrepid Kart Technology	30th
2003	Italian Open Masters — ICA Junior	Intrepid Kart Technology	1st
2003	European Championship — ICA Junior	Intrepid Kart Technology	4th
2003	Swiss Championship — Junior	Cegga Karts	13th
2003	Grand Prix Karting FFSA — Junior		28th

== Racing record ==
=== Racing career summary ===
Season	Series	Team	Races	Wins	Poles	F/Laps	Podiums	Points	Position
2004	Formula BMW ADAC	Lars Kaufmann Motorsport	20	0	2	2	10	188	**3rd**
2005	Formula BMW ADAC	ADAC Berlin-Brandenburg e.V.	20	7	7	12	16	282	**2nd**
2005	Formula BMW World Final	ADAC Berlin-Brandenburg e.V.	1	0	0	0	1	N/A	**2nd**
2005	Spanish Formula 3 Championship	Racing Engineering	1	0	0	0	0	0	NC
2006	Formula 3 Euro Series	ASL Mücke Motorsport	20	1	0	6	3	31	12th
2006	Masters of Formula 3	ASL Mücke Motorsport	1	0	0	0	1	N/A	**3rd**
2006	Formula Renault 2.0 NEC	Motopark Academy	8	2	1	1	6	172	7th
2006	Eurocup Formula Renault 2.0	Motopark Academy	6	1	0	0	1	33	11th
2006	Macau Grand Prix	Carlin Motorsport	1	0	0	0	0	N/A	4th
2006–07	A1 Grand Prix	A1 Team Switzerland	12	0	0	1	0	50	8th
2007	Formula 3 Euro Series	ASL Mücke Motorsport	20	3	2	4	13	95	**2nd**
2007	GP2 Series	ART Grand Prix	11	0	0	3	0	6	21st
2007	Macau Grand Prix	Räikkönen Robertson Racing	1	0	0	0	0	N/A	11th
2008	GP2 Asia Series	Trust Team Arden	10	1	0	1	5	37	**2nd**
2008	GP2 Series	Trust Team Arden	19	2	0	0	5	50	6th
2008	Formula One	Red Bull Racing	Test driver						
2009	Formula One	Scuderia Toro Rosso	17	0	0	0	0	6	16th
2010	Formula One	Scuderia Toro Rosso	19	0	0	0	0	8	16th
2011	Formula One	Scuderia Toro Rosso	19	0	0	0	0	15	15th
2012	FIA World Endurance Championship	Toyota Racing	1	0	0	0	0	0	NC
2012	24 Hours of Le Mans	Toyota Racing	1	0	0	0	0	N/A	DNF
2012	European Le Mans Series - LMP2	Boutsen Ginion Racing	1	0	0	0	0	0	NC
2012	Formula One	Red Bull Racing	Test driver						
2013	FIA World Endurance Championship	Toyota Racing	8	1	0	0	4	106.25	**3rd**
2013	24 Hours of Le Mans	Toyota Racing	1	0	0	0	0	N/A	**2nd**
2013	Formula One	Infiniti Red Bull Racing	Test driver						
2014	FIA World Endurance Championship	Toyota Racing	8	4	2	3	7	166	**1st**
2014	24 Hours of Le Mans	Toyota Racing	1	0	0	0	0	N/A	**3rd**
2014	Formula One	Infiniti Red Bull Racing	Test driver						
2014–15	Formula E	e.dams Renault	11	3	3	1	5	143	**2nd**
2015	FIA World Endurance Championship	Toyota Racing	8	0	0	0	1	79	5th
2015	24 Hours of Le Mans	Toyota Racing	1	0	0	0	0	N/A	8th
2015	Formula One	Infiniti Red Bull Racing	Test driver						
2015–16	Formula E	Renault e.dams	10	3	3	5	6	155	**1st**
2016	FIA World Endurance Championship	Toyota Gazoo Racing	9	0	0	0	1	60	8th
2016	24 Hours of Le Mans	Toyota Gazoo Racing	1	0	0	0	0	N/A	NC
2016	Formula One	Red Bull Racing	Reserve driver						
2016–17	Formula E	Renault e.dams	10	6	2	1	6	157	**2nd**
2017	FIA World Endurance Championship	Toyota Gazoo Racing	9	5	0	1	7	183	**2nd**
2017	24 Hours of Le Mans	Toyota Gazoo Racing	1	0	0	1	0	N/A	8th
2017	IMSA SportsCar Championship - Prototype	Rebellion Racing	2	0	0	0	0	45	26th
2017	Formula One	Red Bull Racing	Reserve driver						
2017–18	Formula E	Renault e.dams	12	0	3	0	4	125	4th
2018	24 Hours of Le Mans	Toyota Gazoo Racing	1	1	1	1	1	N/A	**1st**
2018	Formula One	Aston Martin Red Bull Racing	Reserve driver						
2018–19	Formula E	Nissan e.dams	13	1	3	0	4	119	**2nd**
2018–19	FIA World Endurance Championship	Toyota Gazoo Racing	8	5	4	0	7	198	**1st**
2019	24 Hours of Le Mans	Toyota Gazoo Racing	1	1	0	0	1	N/A	**1st**
2019	Formula One	Aston Martin Red Bull Racing	Reserve driver						
2019–20	Formula E	Nissan e.dams	11	0	0	0	4	84	4th
2019–20	FIA World Endurance Championship	Toyota Gazoo Racing	8	2	1	1	8	202	**2nd**
2020	24 Hours of Le Mans	Toyota Gazoo Racing	1	1	0	0	1	N/A	**1st**
2020	Formula One	Aston Martin Red Bull Racing	Reserve driver						
2020–21	Formula E	Nissan e.dams	15	0	0	0	0	20	21st
2021	FIA World Endurance Championship - Hypercar	Toyota Gazoo Racing	6	3	1	2	5	168	**2nd**
2021	24 Hours of Le Mans - Hypercar	Toyota Gazoo Racing	1	0	0	0	1	N/A	**2nd**
2021	Formula One	Red Bull Racing Honda	Reserve driver						
2021–22	Formula E	Nissan e.dams	16	0	0	0	0	30	15th
2022	FIA World Endurance Championship - Hypercar	Toyota Gazoo Racing	6	2	2	1	5	149	**1st**
2022	24 Hours of Le Mans - Hypercar	Toyota Gazoo Racing	1	1	1	0	1	N/A	**1st**
2022	Formula One	Oracle Red Bull Racing	Reserve driver						
2022–23	Formula E	Envision Racing	16	0	2	2	1	105	6th
2023	FIA World Endurance Championship - Hypercar	Toyota Gazoo Racing	7	2	2	1	6	172	**1st**
2023	24 Hours of Le Mans - Hypercar	Toyota Gazoo Racing	1	0	0	0	0	N/A	**2nd**
2023	Formula One	Oracle Red Bull Racing	Development driver						
2023–24	Formula E	Envision Racing	13	0	0	0	2	53	11th
2024	FIA World Endurance Championship - Hypercar	Toyota Gazoo Racing	8	2	1	1	2	109	4th
2024	Formula One	Oracle Red Bull Racing	Development driver						
2024–25	Formula E	Envision Racing	16	1	0	1	3	84	12th
2025	FIA World Endurance Championship - Hypercar	Toyota Gazoo Racing	7	0	0	0	1	66	7th
2025	Formula One	Oracle Red Bull Racing	Development driver						
2025–26	Formula E	Envision Racing	13	0	1	0	1	75	8th*
2026	FIA World Endurance Championship - Hypercar	Toyota Racing	8	3	0	0	4	115	**1st**
2026	Formula One	Oracle Red Bull Racing	Development driver						

=== Complete Formula BMW ADAC results ===
(key) (Races in bold indicate pole position, races in italics indicate fastest lap)

Year	Team	1	2	3	4	5	6	7	8	9	10	11	12	13	14	15	16	17	18	19	20	DC	Points
2004	Lars Kaufmann Motorsport	HOC1; 1; 4	HOC1; 2; 2	ADR; 1; 3	ADR; 2; 4	NÜR1; 1; 6	NÜR1; 2; 5	LAU; 1; 3	**LAU**; **2**; 2	NOR; 1 DSQ	**NOR**; **2**; 21	NÜR2; 1; 6	NÜR2; 2; 6	OSC; 1; 2	OSC; 2 Ret	ZAN; 1; 3	ZAN; 2; 4	BRN; 1; 3	BRN; 2; 3	HOC2; 1; 2	HOC2; 2; 3	3rd	188
2005	Mücke Motorsport	HOC1; 1; 2	HOC1; 2; 5	LAU; 1; 1	LAU; 2; 3	SPA; 1; 1	**SPA**; **2** Ret	NÜR1; 1; 2	NÜR1; 2; 3	**BRN**; **1**; 2	**BRN**; **2**; 1	OSC; 1; 2	**OSC**; **2**; 1	**NOR**; **1**; 5	NOR; 2; 2	NÜR2; 1; 1	**NÜR2**; **2**; 1	**ZAN**; **1**; 2	ZAN; 2; 1	HOC2; 1; 16	HOC2; 2; 3	2nd	282

=== Complete Formula Renault 2.0 NEC results ===
(key) (Races in bold indicate pole position) (Races in italics indicate fastest lap)

Year	Entrant	1	2	3	4	5	6	7	8	9	10	11	12	13	14	15	16	DC	Points
2006	Motopark Academy	OSC; 1	OSC; 2	SPA; 1	SPA; 2	NÜR; 1; 1	NÜR; 2; 3	ZAN; 1; 2	ZAN; 2; 5	OSC; 1	OSC; 2	ASS; 1	ASS; 2	AND; 1; 2	AND; 2; 26	**SAL**; **1**; 1	SAL; 2; 2	7th	172

=== Complete Eurocup Formula Renault 2.0 results ===
(key) (Races in bold indicate pole position; races in italics indicate fastest lap)

Year	Entrant	1	2	3	4	5	6	7	8	9	10	11	12	13	14	DC	Points
2006	Motopark Academy	ZOL; 1	ZOL; 2	IST; 1; 4	IST; 2; 8	MIS; 1 Ret	MIS; 2; 9	NÜR; 1	NÜR; 2	DON; 1; 1	DON; 2; 6	LMS; 1	LMS; 2	CAT; 1	CAT; 2	11th	33

=== Complete Formula 3 Euro Series results ===
(key) (Races in bold indicate pole position; races in italics indicate fastest lap)

Year	Team	Chassis	Engine	1	2	3	4	5	6	7	8	9	10	11	12	13	14	15	16	17	18	19	20	Pos	Points
2006	ASL Mücke Motorsport	Dallara F305/011	Mercedes	HOC; 1; 19	HOC; 2; 14	LAU; 1 Ret	LAU; 2; 12	OSC; 1; 7	OSC; 2; 1	BRH; 1; 21	BRH; 2; 16	NOR; 1; 7	NOR; 2; 11	NÜR; 1; 4	NÜR; 2; 8	ZAN; 1 Ret	ZAN; 2; 8	CAT; 1; 7	CAT; 2; 5	BUG; 1 DSQ	BUG; 2; 11	HOC; 1; 2	HOC; 2; 3	12th	31
2007	ASL Mücke Motorsport	Dallara F305/011	Mercedes	**HOC**; **1**; 1	HOC; 2; 3	BRH; 1; 7	BRH; 2; 2	**NOR**; **1**; 2	NOR; 2; 2	MAG; 1; 3	MAG; 2; 19	MUG; 1; 3	MUG; 2; 5	ZAN; 1; 3	ZAN; 2; 2	NÜR; 1; 2	NÜR; 2; 3	CAT; 1 Ret	CAT; 2; 6	NOG; 1; 4	NOG; 2; 1	HOC; 1; 5	HOC; 2; 1	2nd	95

=== Complete A1 Grand Prix results ===
(key)

Year	Entrant	1	2	3	4	5	6	7	8	9	10	11	12	13	14	15	16	17	18	19	20	21	22	DC	Points
2006–07	Switzerland	NED; SPR; 10	NED; FEA; 8	CZE; SPR; 8	CZE; FEA; 10	BEI; SPR	BEI; FEA	MYS; SPR	MYS; FEA	IDN; SPR	IDN; FEA	NZL; SPR; 5	NZL; FEA; 4	AUS; SPR; 4	AUS; FEA; 7	RSA; SPR	RSA; FEA	MEX; SPR	MEX; FEA	SHA; SPR; 4	SHA; FEA; 9	GBR; SPR; Ret	GBR; SPR; DSQ	8th	50

=== Complete GP2 Series results ===
(key) (Races in italics indicate fastest lap)

Year	Entrant	1	2	3	4	5	6	7	8	9	10	11	12	13	14	15	16	17	18	19	20	21	DC	Points
2007	ART Grand Prix	BHR; FEA	BHR; SPR	CAT; FEA	CAT; SPR	MON; FEA; 7	MAG; FEA	MAG; SPR	SIL; FEA	SIL; SPR	NÜR; FEA; Ret	NÜR; SPR; 20	HUN; FEA; 15	HUN; SPR; 17	IST; FEA; Ret	IST; SPR; 13	MNZ; FEA; 7	MNZ; SPR; 14	SPA; FEA; 10	SPA; SPR; Ret	VAL; FEA	VAL; SPR	21st	6
2008	Trust Team Arden	CAT; FEA; 7	CAT; SPR; 2	IST; FEA; 6	IST; SPR; 3	MON; FEA; Ret	MON; SPR; 11	MAG; FEA; Ret	MAG; SPR; 1	SIL; FEA; 4	SIL; SPR; DNS	HOC; FEA; Ret	HOC; SPR; 8	HUN; FEA; 7	HUN; SPR; 1	VAL; FEA; 6	VAL; SPR; Ret	SPA; FEA; 5	SPA; SPR; 4	MNZ; FEA; 3	MNZ; SPR; 7		6th	50

==== Complete GP2 Asia Series results ====
(key) (Races in italics indicate fastest lap)

Year	Entrant	1	2	3	4	5	6	7	8	9	10	DC	Points
2008	Trust Team Arden	DUB1; FEA; DSQ	DUB1; SPR; Ret	SEN; FEA; 1	SEN; SPR; 7	SEP; FEA; Ret	SEP; SPR; Ret	BHR; FEA; 2	BHR; SPR; 2	DUB2; FEA; 2	DUB2; SPR; 2	2nd	37

=== Complete Formula One results ===
(key)

Year	Entrant	Chassis	Engine	1	2	3	4	5	6	7	8	9	10	11	12	13	14	15	16	17	18	19	WDC	Points
2009	Scuderia Toro Rosso	Toro Rosso STR4	Ferrari 056 2.4 V8	AUS; 7	MAL; 16†	CHN; 8	BHR; 17	ESP; Ret	MON; Ret	TUR; 15	GBR; 18	GER; 16	HUN; 16	EUR; Ret	BEL; 12	ITA; 13†	SIN; Ret	JPN; Ret	BRA; 7	ABU; 8			16th	6
2010	Scuderia Toro Rosso	Toro Rosso STR5	Ferrari 056 2.4 V8	BHR; 16†	AUS; Ret	MAL; 11	CHN; Ret	ESP; Ret	MON; 10	TUR; 16	CAN; 8	EUR; 9	GBR; 12	GER; Ret	HUN; 12	BEL; 12	ITA; 11	SIN; 14	JPN; 10	KOR; Ret	BRA; 13	ABU; 15	16th	8
2011	Scuderia Toro Rosso	Toro Rosso STR6	Ferrari 056 2.4 V8	AUS; 8	MAL; 13	CHN; 14	TUR; 9	ESP; 14	MON; 10	CAN; 10	EUR; 13	GBR; Ret	GER; 15	HUN; 8	BEL; Ret	ITA; 10	SIN; 12	JPN; Ret	KOR; 9	IND; Ret	ABU; Ret	BRA; 12	15th	15

^{†} Driver failed to finish the race, but was classified as he had completed more than 90% of the race distance.

=== Complete 24 Hours of Le Mans results ===
Year	Team	Co-Drivers	Car	Class	Laps	Pos.	Class Pos.
2012	(Japan) Toyota Racing	(United Kingdom) Anthony Davidson (France) Stéphane Sarrazin	Toyota TS030 Hybrid	LMP1	82	DNF	DNF
2013	(Japan) Toyota Racing	(United Kingdom) Anthony Davidson (France) Stéphane Sarrazin	Toyota TS030 Hybrid	LMP1	347	**2nd**	**2nd**
2014	(Japan) Toyota Racing	(United Kingdom) Anthony Davidson (France) Nicolas Lapierre	Toyota TS040 Hybrid	LMP1-H	374	**3rd**	**3rd**
2015	(Japan) Toyota Racing	(United Kingdom) Anthony Davidson (Japan) Kazuki Nakajima	Toyota TS040 Hybrid	LMP1	386	8th	8th
2016	(Japan) Toyota Gazoo Racing	(United Kingdom) Anthony Davidson (Japan) Kazuki Nakajima	Toyota TS050 Hybrid	LMP1	384	NC	NC
2017	(Japan) Toyota Gazoo Racing	(United Kingdom) Anthony Davidson (Japan) Kazuki Nakajima	Toyota TS050 Hybrid	LMP1	358	8th	**2nd**
2018	(Japan) Toyota Gazoo Racing	(Spain) Fernando Alonso (Japan) Kazuki Nakajima	Toyota TS050 Hybrid	LMP1	388	**1st**	**1st**
2019	(Japan) Toyota Gazoo Racing	(Spain) Fernando Alonso (Japan) Kazuki Nakajima	Toyota TS050 Hybrid	LMP1	385	**1st**	**1st**
2020	(Japan) Toyota Gazoo Racing	(New Zealand) Brendon Hartley (Japan) Kazuki Nakajima	Toyota TS050 Hybrid	LMP1	387	**1st**	**1st**
2021	(Japan) Toyota Gazoo Racing	(New Zealand) Brendon Hartley (Japan) Kazuki Nakajima	Toyota GR010 Hybrid	Hypercar	369	**2nd**	**2nd**
2022	(Japan) Toyota Gazoo Racing	(New Zealand) Brendon Hartley (Japan) Ryō Hirakawa	Toyota GR010 Hybrid	Hypercar	380	**1st**	**1st**
2023	(Japan) Toyota Gazoo Racing	(New Zealand) Brendon Hartley (Japan) Ryō Hirakawa	Toyota GR010 Hybrid	Hypercar	342	**2nd**	**2nd**
2024	(Japan) Toyota Gazoo Racing	(New Zealand) Brendon Hartley (Japan) Ryō Hirakawa	Toyota GR010 Hybrid	Hypercar	311	5th	5th
2025	(Japan) Toyota Gazoo Racing	(New Zealand) Brendon Hartley (Japan) Ryō Hirakawa	Toyota GR010 Hybrid	Hypercar	380	15th	15th
2026	(Japan) Toyota Racing	(New Zealand) Brendon Hartley (Japan) Ryō Hirakawa	Toyota TR010 Hybrid	Hypercar	381	**3rd**	**3rd**

=== Complete FIA World Endurance Championship results ===
(key) (Races in bold indicate pole position; races in italics indicate fastest lap)

Year	Entrant	Class	Chassis	Engine	1	2	3	4	5	6	7	8	9	Rank	Points
2012	Toyota Racing	LMP1	Toyota TS030 Hybrid	Toyota RV8KLM 3.4 L V8 (Hybrid)	SEB	SPA	LMS; Ret	SIL	SÃO	BHR	FUJ	SHA		NC	0
2013	Toyota Racing	LMP1	Toyota TS030 Hybrid	Toyota RV8KLM 3.4 L V8 (Hybrid)	SIL; 3	SPA; 4	LMS; 2	SÃO; Ret	COA; 2	FUJ; 15	SHA; Ret	BHR; 1		3rd	106.25
2014	Toyota Racing	LMP1	Toyota TS040 Hybrid	Toyota RV8KLM 3.7 L V8 (Hybrid)	SIL; 1	SPA; 1	LMS; 3	**COA**; 3	**FUJ**; 1	SHA; 1	BHR; 10	SÃO; 2		1st	166
2015	Toyota Racing	LMP1	Toyota TS040 Hybrid	Toyota RV8KLM 3.7 L V8 (Hybrid)	SIL; 3	SPA; 8	LMS; 8	NÜR; 5	COA; 4	FUJ; 5	SHA; 6	BHR; 4		5th	79
2016	Toyota Gazoo Racing	LMP1	Toyota TS050 Hybrid	Toyota H8909 2.4 L Turbo V6 (Hybrid)	SIL; 16	SPA; 27	LMS; NC	NÜR; 5	MEX; Ret	COA; 5	FUJ; 4	SHA; 3	BHR; 4	8th	60
2017	Toyota Gazoo Racing	LMP1	Toyota TS050 Hybrid	Toyota H8909 2.4 L Turbo V6 (Hybrid)	SIL; 1	SPA; 1	LMS; 6	NÜR; 4	MEX; 3	COA; 3	FUJ; 1	SHA; 1	BHR; 1	2nd	183
2018–19	Toyota Gazoo Racing	LMP1	Toyota TS050 Hybrid	Toyota H8909 2.4 L Turbo V6 (Hybrid)	**SPA**; 1	**LMS**; 1	SIL; DSQ	**FUJ**; 2	SHA; 2	**SEB**; 1	SPA; 1	LMS; 1		1st	198
2019–20	Toyota Gazoo Racing	LMP1	Toyota TS050 Hybrid	Toyota H8909 2.4 L Turbo V6 (Hybrid)	SIL; 2	**FUJ**; 1	SHA; 2	BHR; 2	COA; 2	SPA; 2	LMS; 1	BHR; 2		2nd	202
2021	Toyota Gazoo Racing	Hypercar	Toyota GR010 Hybrid	Toyota H8909 3.5 L Turbo V6 (Hybrid)	SPA; 1	ALG; 1	MNZ; 4	LMS; 2	**BHR**; 2	BHR; 1				2nd	168
2022	Toyota Gazoo Racing	Hypercar	Toyota GR010 Hybrid	Toyota H8909 3.5 L Turbo V6 (Hybrid)	SEB; 2	SPA; Ret	**LMS**; 1	MNZ; 2	FUJ; 1	**BHR**; 2				1st	149
2023	Toyota Gazoo Racing	Hypercar	Toyota GR010 Hybrid	Toyota H8909 3.5 L Turbo V6 (Hybrid)	SEB; 2	**ALG**; 1	SPA; 2	LMS; 2	MNZ; 6	FUJ; 2	**BHR**; 1			1st	172
2024	Toyota Gazoo Racing	Hypercar	Toyota GR010 Hybrid	Toyota H8909 3.5 L Turbo V6 (Hybrid)	QAT; 8	IMO; 5	SPA; 6	LMS; 5	SÃO; 1	COA; 15	FUJ; 10	**BHR**; 1		4th	109
2025	Toyota Gazoo Racing	Hypercar	Toyota GR010 Hybrid	Toyota H8909 3.5 L Turbo V6 (Hybrid)	QAT; 5	IMO; 5	SPA; 4	LMS; 14	SÃO	COA; 9	FUJ; 16	BHR; 2		7th	66
2026	Toyota Racing	Hypercar	Toyota TR010 Hybrid	Toyota H8909 3.5 L Turbo V6 (Hybrid)	IMO; 1	SPA; 10	LMS; 3	SÃO; 17	COA; 6	FUJ; 1	CAT; 1	MNZ; 10		1st	115

=== Complete IMSA SportsCar Championship results ===
Year	Entrant	Class	Chassis	Engine	1	2	3	4	5	6	7	8	9	10	Rank	Points
2017	Rebellion Racing	P	Oreca 07	Gibson GK428 4.2 L V8	DAY; 8	SEB; 9	LBH	COA	DET	WGL	MOS	ELK	LGA	PET	26th	45

=== Complete Formula E results ===
(key) (Races in bold indicate pole position; races in italics indicate fastest lap)

Year	Team	Chassis	Powertrain	1	2	3	4	5	6	7	8	9	10	11	12	13	14	15	16	17	Pos	Points
2014–15	Team e.dams Renault	Spark SRT01-e	SRT01-e	BEI; Ret	PUT; 3	PDE; 1	**BUE**; Ret	MIA; 13	LBH; 4	**MCO**; 1	BER; 2	MSC; 9	**LDN**; 1	LDN; 5							2nd	143
2015–16	Renault e.dams	Spark SRT01-e	Renault Z.E 15	**BEI**; 1	**PUT**; 12	PDE; 1	BUE; 2	MEX; 2	LBH; 16	PAR; 3	BER; 1	LDN; 5	**LDN**; Ret								1st	155
2016–17	Renault e.dams	Spark SRT01-e	Renault Z.E 16	HKG; 1	MRK; 1	BUE; 1	MEX; 14	**MCO**; 1	**PAR**; 1	BER; DSQ	BER; 1	NYC	NYC	MTL; DSQ	MTL; 11						2nd	157
2017–18	Renault e.dams	Spark SRT01-e	Renault Z.E 17	HKG; 11	HKG; 10	**MRK**; 2	SCL; 3	MEX; 3	PDE; Ret	RME; 6	PAR; 5	BER; 4	ZUR; 5	**NYC**; 3	**NYC**; 4						4th	125
2018–19	Nissan e.dams	Spark SRT05e	Nissan IM01	ADR; 6	MRK; 8	**SCL**; Ret	MEX; 21†	HKG; Ret	SYX; 8	RME; 5	PAR; 15	MCO; 5	**BER**; 2	BRN; 3	**NYC**; 1	NYC; 3					2nd	119
2019–20	Nissan e.dams	Spark SRT05e	Nissan IM02	DIR; Ret	DIR; 12	SCL; 13	MEX; 3	MRK; 4	BER; 7	BER; 2	BER; 11	BER; 3	BER; 10	BER; 3							4th	84
2020–21	Nissan e.dams	Spark SRT05e	Nissan IM02/IM03	DIR; 13	DIR; Ret	RME; 5	RME; 10	VLC; Ret	VLC; 11	MCO; 11	PUE; DSQ	PUE; 14	NYC; 6	NYC; 15	LDN; DSQ	LDN; 13	BER; 11	BER; 14			21st	20
2021–22	Nissan e.dams	Spark SRT05e	Nissan IM03	DRH; 17	DRH; 13	MEX; 8	RME; 16	RME; 9	MCO; 8	BER; 14	BER; 14	JAK; 11	MRK; 16	NYC; 5	NYC; 13	LDN; 11	LDN; 6	SEO; Ret	SEO; 9		15th	30
2022–23	Envision Racing	Formula E Gen3	Jaguar I-Type 6	MEX; 6	**DRH**; 4	DRH; 6	HYD; 15	CAP; 5	SAP; 10	**BER**; 4	BER; 20	MCO; 8	JAK; 20	JAK; 10	POR; 5	RME; Ret	RME; 5	LDN; 3	LDN; 6		6th	105
2023–24	Envision Racing	Formula E Gen3	Jaguar I-Type 6	MEX; 2	DRH; 12	DRH; WD	SAP; 10	TOK; 13	MIS; 12	MIS; Ret	MCO; 15	BER	BER	SIC; 8	SIC; 12	POR; 20	POR; 9	LDN; 3	LDN; 4		11th	53
2024–25	Envision Racing	Formula E Gen3 Evo	Jaguar I-Type 7	SAO; 7	MEX; 17	JED; 12	JED; 19	MIA; 13	MCO; 19	MCO; 1	TKO; 4	TKO; 9	SHA; 9	SHA; 18	JKT; 3	BER; 7	BER; Ret	LDN; 16	LDN; 3		12th	84
2025–26	Envision Racing	Formula E Gen3 Evo	Jaguar I-Type 7	SAO; 8	**MEX**; 17	MIA; 7	JED; 7	JED; 2	MAD; 7	BER; 12	BER; 4	MCO; 5	MCO; 17	SAN; 13	SHA; 18	SHA; 5	TKO; 14	TKO; 15	LDN; 4	LDN; 5	10th	97

^{†} Did not finish, but was classified as he had completed more than 90% of the race distance.

Sporting positions
Preceded by Tom Kristensen; Allan McNish; Loïc Duval	World Endurance Drivers Champion; 2014; With: Anthony Davidson	Succeeded by Timo Bernhard; Brendon Hartley; Mark Webber
Preceded by Nelson Piquet Jr.	Formula E Champion; 2015-16	Succeeded by Lucas di Grassi
Preceded by Timo Bernhard; Brendon Hartley; Earl Bamber	Winner of the 24 Hours of Le Mans; 2018, 2019, 2020; With: Fernando Alonso (2018-19), Kazuki Nakajima (2018-20) & Brendon Hartley (2020)	Succeeded by Mike Conway; Kamui Kobayashi; José María López
Preceded by Timo Bernhard; Brendon Hartley; Earl Bamber	World Endurance Drivers Champion; 2018–19; With: Fernando Alonso & Kazuki Nakajima	Succeeded by Mike Conway; Kamui Kobayashi; José María López
Preceded by Mike Conway; Kamui Kobayashi; José María López	Winner of the 24 Hours of Le Mans; 2022; With: Brendon Hartley & Ryo Hirakawa	Succeeded by James Calado; Antonio Giovinazzi; Alessandro Pier Guidi
Preceded by Mike Conway; Kamui Kobayashi; José María López	World Endurance Drivers Champion; 2022-2023; With: Brendon Hartley & Ryo Hirakawa	Succeeded by Kévin Estre; André Lotterer; Laurens Vanthoor
Preceded by James Calado; Antonio Giovinazzi; Alessandro Pier Guidi	World Endurance Drivers Champion; 2026; With: Brendon Hartley & Ryo Hirakawa	Succeeded by Incumbent
