= Chipshol =

Dutch area development company

- Industry: Area development
- Founded: 1986
- Headquarters: Schiphol-Rijk, Netherlands
- Website: www.chipshol.com

Chipshol is a Dutch development company. The company was founded in 1986 by Jan Poot in The Hague.

Chipshol owns land around Schiphol Airport, with both residential and commercial locations. In total, Chipshol controlled 1483 acres of land. The company is headquartered in a business park near the airport.

The name Chipshol is derived from the name of the airport - Schiphol - and "Chip", from the high-tech industry which Poot planned to bring to the region in a new airport city.

== Chipshol Affair ==
The Chipshol Affair was a legal issue over land around Schiphol. The legal issue started in 1993 and was closed in 2014. The matter revolved around the Chipshol company, the Dutch central government, the judiciary and Schiphol airport.

In the mid 1980s Jan Poot began to acquire farming land in the area of Schiphol airport. Chipshol, the company which he subsequently formed to manage the assets and which is run by his son Peter, was the largest private owner of land in the area adjacent to the airport. Imagining that cities would grow around airports, as Amsterdam itself had grown around its seaport, Poot sought to build an Airport City.

Poot presented his plans to the management of Schiphol airport, but was turned away. Chipshol then ran into development issues when the airport expressed concerns for aviation safety and other considerations that were not applied to other developers in the same vicinity. In the 1980s, the company owned over 1200 acres, and after the lawsuits and planning measures, the Poot's lost control of over 900 acres.

Since then, a sequence of events outlined in several lawsuits occurred that saw significant portions of the Poot's land confiscated with the help of the judiciary and Schiphol officials. Jan Poot and his son CEO Peter Poot started approximately one hundred lawsuits to recover the land. A Dutch clerk revealed two vice presidents of The Hague court had close ties to Chipshol's opponents. It was alleged to be the reason Chipshol lost the majority of its land. Jan Poot charged perjury in 2009, and only after public and media pressure did the Public Prosecutor decide to prosecute the judges, being the first time in Dutch legal history.

Two judges of The Hague court were accused of corruption and conspiracy to prevent Chipshol from building its airport city. Pieter Kalbfleisch, a former Dutch Competition Authority NMA chairman, was one of the judges named. The judges were acquitted.
