= Trust (company) =

Dutch electronics manufacturer

Trust International B.V.
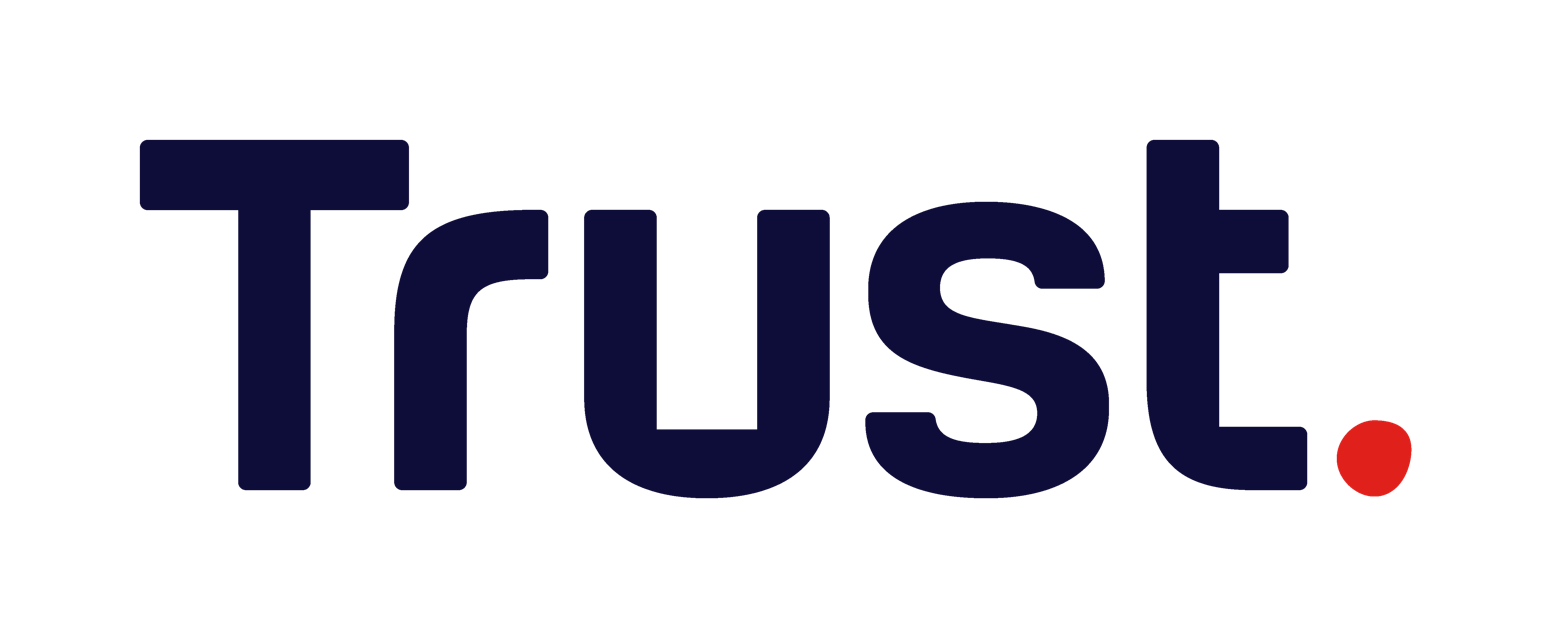

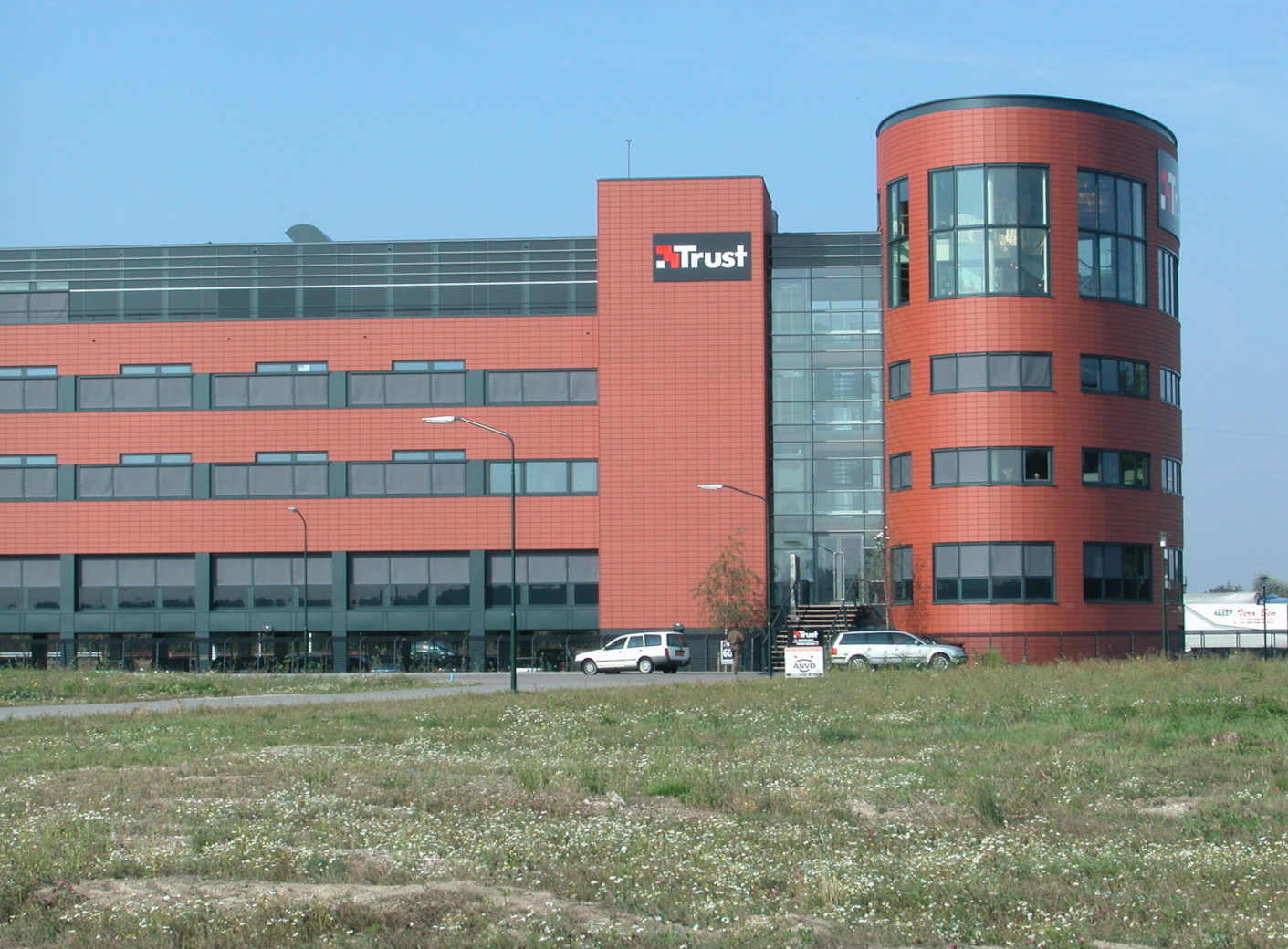
- Trust's headquarters in Dordrecht, Netherlands
- Formerly: Aashima Technology B.V. (1983-2003)
- Type: Private
- Industry: Electronics
- Founded: 1983; 43 years ago
- Founder: Michel Perridon
- Headquarters: Dordrecht, Netherlands
- Area served: Worldwide
- Products: Computer peripherals and accessories
- Owner: Egeria (100%)
- Parent: Egeria
- Website: www.trust.com

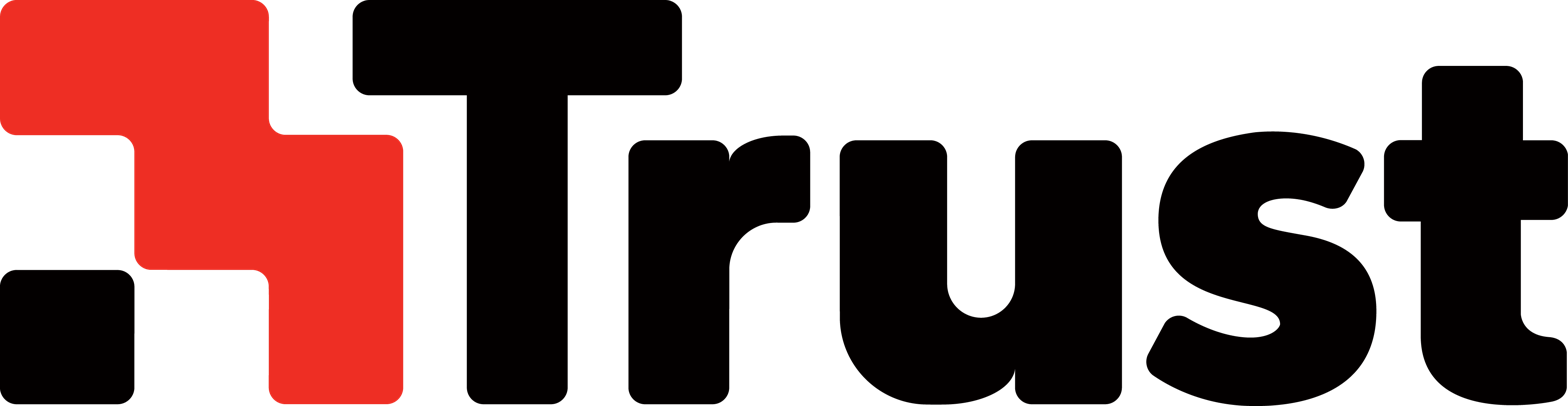
Old logo (2003–2022)

Trust International B.V. is a Dutch company producing value digital lifestyle accessories including PC peripherals and accessories for video gaming. Based in Dordrecht, it was originally founded in 1983 as Aashima Technology B.V. before gaining its current name in 2003.

== Products ==
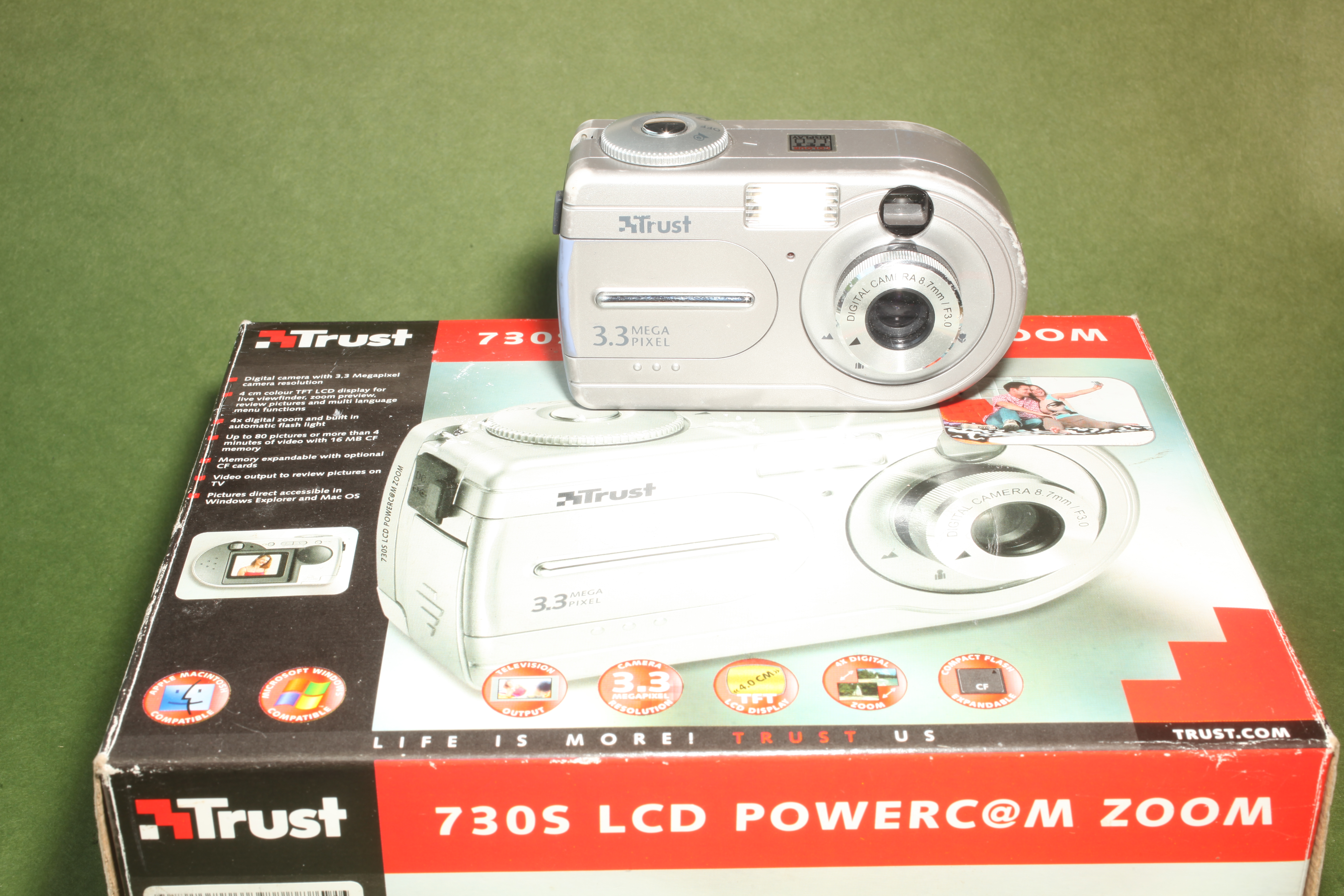
TRUST 730S LCD POWERC@M ZOOM

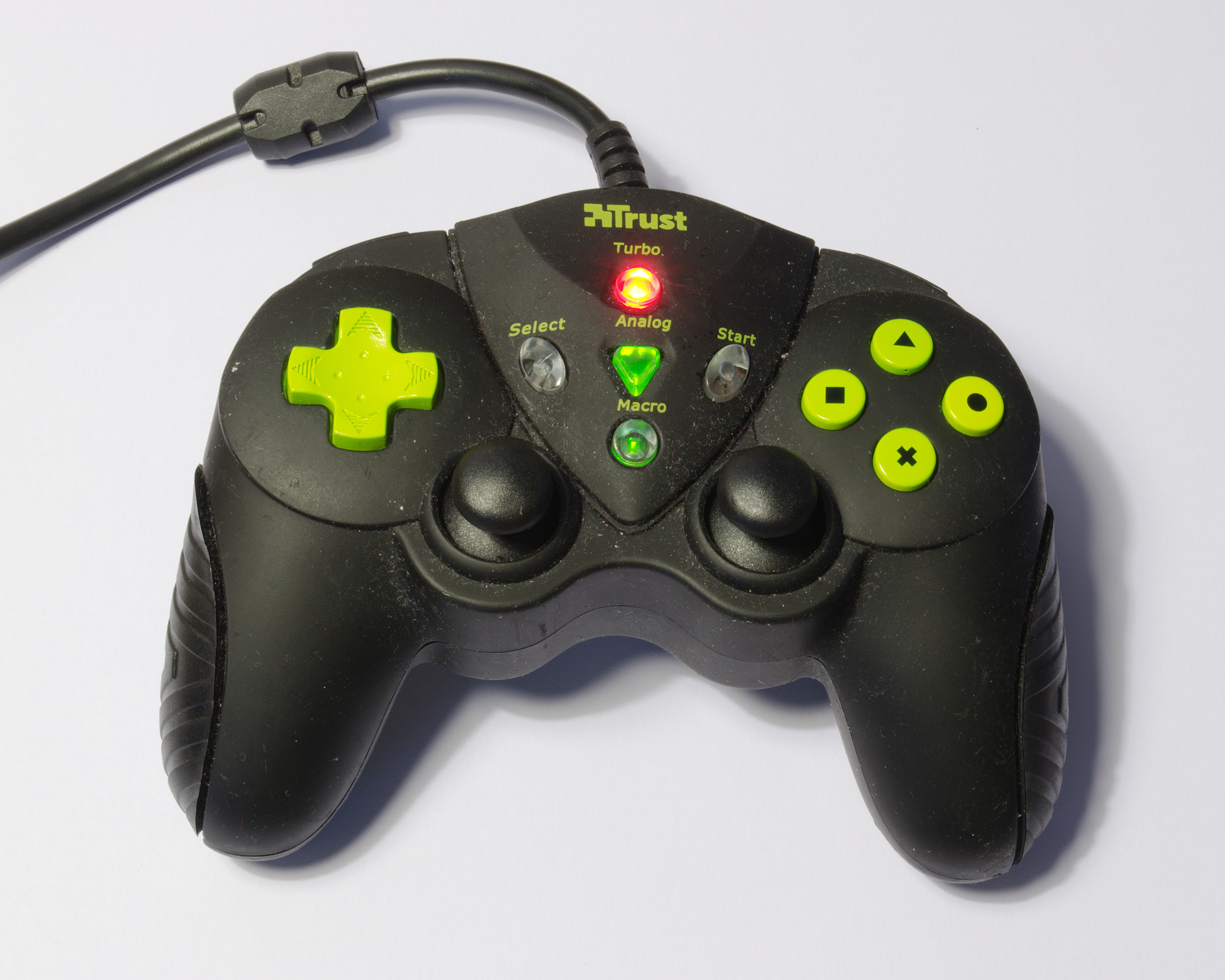
A Trust gamepad controller for PlayStation 2

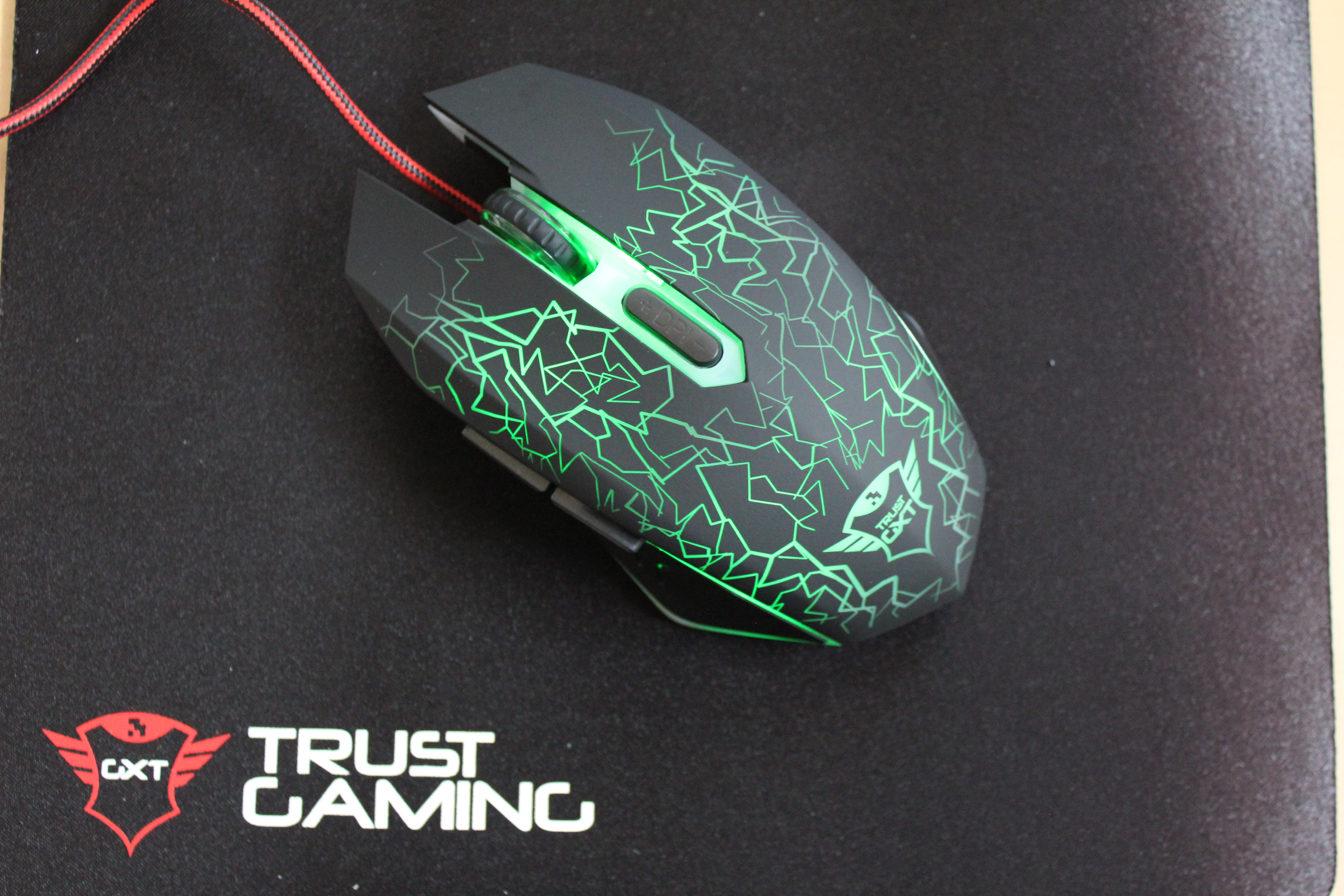
Computer mouse released under the Trust Gaming brand

The company's product lines are divided into Home & Office, Gaming, Smart Home, and Business to Business (B2B). Products that the company has covered for many years include mice, keyboards, webcams and headsets. Trust's products are sold in specialist stores, large retailers, electronics chains and online stores in over 50 countries.

In the past, Trust also produced peripherals such as scanners and modems.

== Sports sponsorship ==
Dutch F1 driver Jos Verstappen used his strong Dutch links to gain sponsorship for the Minardi F1 Team in 2003 when Trust became one of the team sponsors. That sponsorship was moved to Jordan Grand Prix in 2004 when Verstappen was on the verge of a race seat with the team. Trust had a sponsorship agreement with Spyker F1 as the team started to bring in Dutch sponsorship. Trust was the head sponsor of the Arden International team, which competed in the GP2 and GP2 Asia series, and previously in Formula 3000. Because of the sponsorship, the team has been dubbed Trust Team Arden.

Trust also sponsored Minardi Team USA in the 2007 Champ Car World Series for much of the season but ended their sponsorship at the end of the season after the team stopped competing at the end of the year due to the unification of Champ Car and Indycar. Trust sponsored Red Bull Racing in 2009, both Sebastian Vettel and Mark Webber had the Trust name visible on the chin bar of their helmets.

== See also ==
- List of Dutch companies
