= VanDutch =

Dutch yachting company

- Original logo
- Type: Private
- Industry: Yacht Manufacturing
- Founded: 2008 in Heerenveen, Netherlands
- Founders: Henk Erenstein, Ruud Koekkoek
- Headquarters: 2300 East Las Olas Boulevard, Ft. Lauderdale, United States
- Number of locations: 13 (2019)
- Area served: United States; Canada; Caribbean; Mexico; Europe; Middle East
- Website: vandutch.com

VanDutch Inc. (/vænˈdʌtʃ/) is a Dutch yachting company, which started commercial manufacturing in 2009 with its first model, the VanDutch 40. Since, the company has expanded its model line to include the 30, 40.2 (new 2019), Super Yacht Edition (new 2019), 48 (new 2019), 56 (new 2019) and 75. Its headquarters are based in Fort Lauderdale, FL, with European headquarters in Port de la Rague, France, and design offices in Amstelveen, Holland.

== About VanDutch ==
VanDutch was founded in 2008. VanDutch introduced its first model—the VanDutch 40—in 2009. The brand was introduced in the South of France through partnerships with companies like Red Bull Racing during the Monaco Grand Prix.

It started USA operations in 2013, with offices in Fort Lauderdale, FL, and later opened new office space on the Miami River in Miami, FL in January 2019.

In 2013 it signed an agreement with Marquis Yachts to grant exclusive manufacturing rights that were previously given to S2 Yachts. Marquis filed a litigation case against VanDutch for a contract term dispute in 2015 that was settled without disclosing the terms.

VanDutch sponsored FIA Formula E Championship racing team Amlin Aguri in 2014 along with Amlin and Sparco. It participates regularly in lifestyle marketing activities during boat shows, including the Miami International Boat Show and the Monaco Yacht Show.

In September 2016, the founders Ruud Koekkoek and Henk Erenstein were sentenced by the British High Court of Justice on a probationary basis, after not complying with the conditions of a bridge loan of roughly €2 million. In March 2018, this probationary sentence was revoked, with the two being imprisoned. Being in financial trouble, among other things, VanDutch sold vessels that they would not end up delivering.

In January 2017, VanDutch, Inc, the company's Americas distributor, operated the purchase of the global brand including the IP, molds, trademarks and copyrights, from VanDutch Marine LTD., the company's original holding and ownership entity.

The company sold more than 160 hulls through November 2018.
