= IPTP Networks =

- Type: Group of privately held companies
- Industry: Internet
- Founded: 1996
- Headquarters: Limassol, Cyprus
- Services: Managed services; Hosting; Software as a service; Ethernet Private Line; Internet; DDoS mitigation; Internet transit; Security service (telecommunication); Colocation; Low Latency; MPLS
- Number of employees: 151-200
- ASNs: 41095; 150951; 263681; 51601; 20842; 149105
- Traffic Levels: 1Tbps+
- Website: https://www.iptp.net/

IPTP Networks is an international telecommunications company. Founded in Cyprus as a System Integrator in 1996, it developed into an international group over the next decade. IPTP Networks operates a global backbone as a Tier-1-class-network Internet Service Provider (ISP) providing connectivity through 225+ PoPs worldwide.

== Operations ==
IPTP operates a proprietary, multi-functional and redundant broadband MPLS network with approximately 229 points of presence (PoPs) and 77 hosting/colocation facilities throughout the world. The company utilizes Trans-Atlantic, Trans-Pacific, Trans-Eurasian, Indian and Mediterranean submarine and terrestrial assets (Optical fibre cable), connecting clients to key IXs (Internet exchange point) and global financial centres.

== Peering ==
IPTP Networks is an Internet provider (AS41095). As a member of AMS-IX, DE-CIX, LINX, MSK-IX, Digital Realty Internet Exchanges and so on it uses a selective Peering policy. According to the European Internet Exchange Association (Euro-IX), IPTP Networks has presented at more than 20 Euro-IX member IXPs.

In 2020, IPTP connected to IX.BR (Brazil), Australia IX, New Zealand IX, ZA-INX (South Africa) and VNIX (Vietnam).

In 2021, IPTP (ASN 51601) connected to Speed Internet Exchange - an Internet exchange platform in Amsterdam (the Netherlands) and also joined the BBIX Transit Partner Program (TPP).

== GSM ==
IPTP Networks acquired Wherr in 2013 and launched the Wherr GSM (Global System for Mobile Communications) tracking solution in Hong Kong in 2016.
