= SenseGlove =

Dutch technology company

- Industry: VR technology
- Founded: 2017
- Founders: Gijs den Butter (CPO) and Johannes Luijten (CTO)
- Headquarters: Delft, Netherlands
- Website: https://www.senseglove.com/

SenseGlove is a Dutch technology company that develops and manufactures wearable hand haptic products for use in virtual reality (VR), VR/AR training, research and other applications. The company is headquartered in Delft, Netherlands.

== Overview ==
SenseGlove develops force and haptic feedback gloves that enable to emulate natural feelings for users interacting with virtual objects. This includes the sense of its size, stiffness, and resistance.

Their products are mainly used for enterprise training in automotive, aviation, defense, healthcare and research sectors.

== History ==
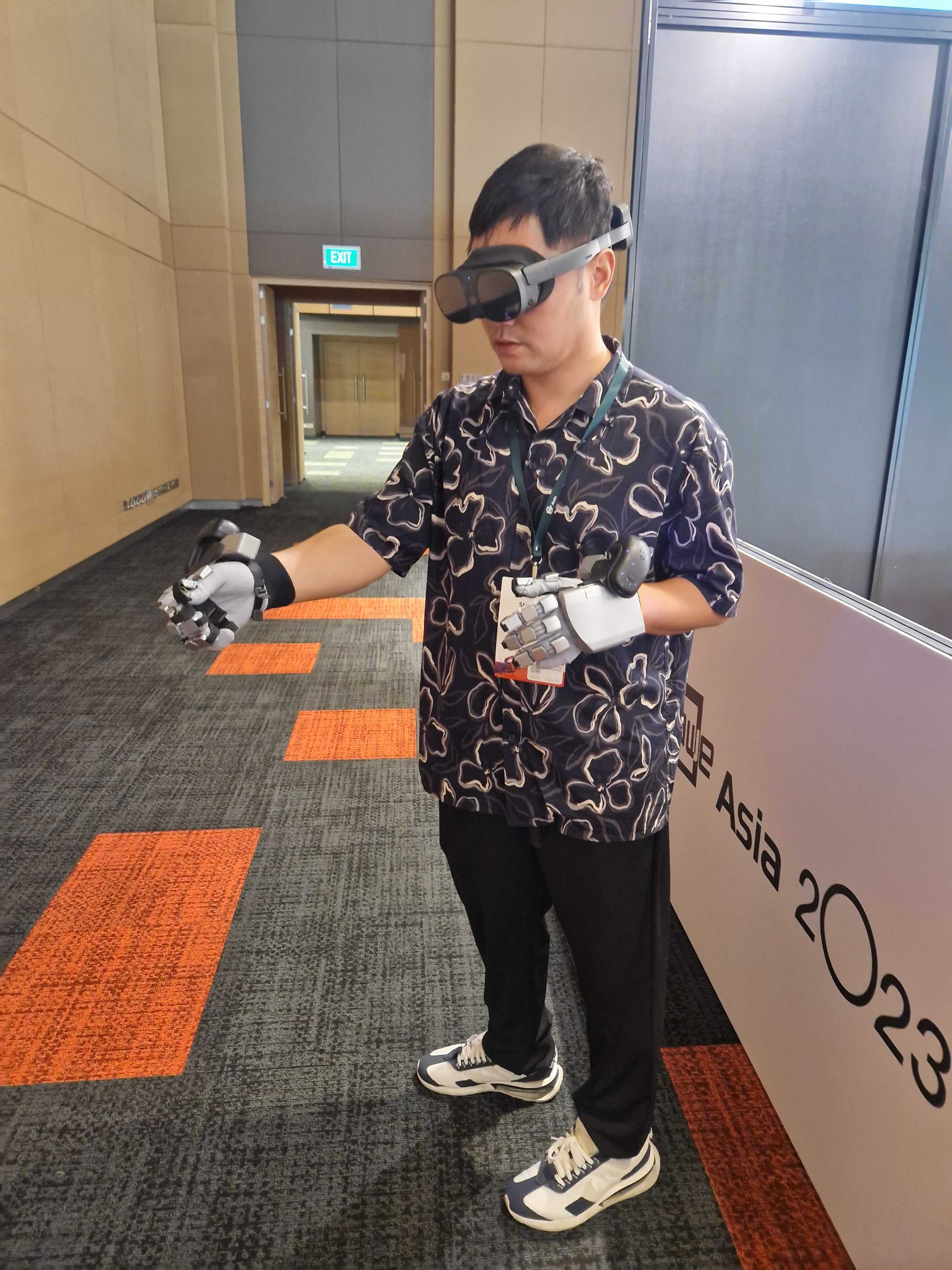
SenseGlove at Awe Asia 2023

SenseGlove was initially a graduation project of its two founders, Johannes Luijten and Gijs den Butter, at the Delft University of Technology. The initial working prototype was introduced in 2017 when developers aimed to create a rehabilitation device for stroke victims. The company's first haptic force-feedback glove, SenseGlove DK1, was designed as an exoskeleton for hands that was capable of providing haptic sensations and had the functions of fingers tracking, vibrotactile feedback and force-feedback. It was mainly used for research and telerobotics applications.

In 2021, SenseGlove announced SenseGlove Nova, a new version of haptic force-feedback gloves designed for VR training purposes. It was redesigned to be wireless and more compact than DK1.

In 2022, DK1 has been used in a project that won Ana Avatar XPrize by X Prize Foundation.

In his Dope Tech review in 2022, Marques Brownlee, an American tech commentator, reviewed the SenseGlove and praised the technology behind the product. While CNET observer after testing the SenseGlove Nova commented that haptic technology is yet to become a common fixture in home VR setups.

In May 2023 SenseGlove announced the second generation of Nova – the “Nova 2.” The Nova 2 features palm feedback to simulate a feeling inside the user's hand and provide an increased level of realism in virtual training, research, and social multiplayer interactions.

== Products ==
SenseGlove Nova is a wireless haptic glove that is able to provide force feedback (by applying resistance through its magnetic friction brakes). Its vibrotactile feedback renders the feeling of realistic button clicks, vibrations, and impact simulations.

SenseGlove Nova 2 is equipped with active contact feedback, a feature that comes in addition to force-feedback and vibrotactile-feedback which are already key features of the Nova. This function, as developers describe it, impact user's palms physically depending on the virtual objects being carried that makes one feel it even more realistic.
