= FRABA =

Company founded in Germany

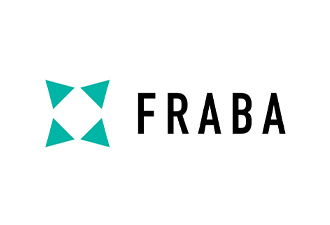
- Logo (2021)
- Founded: 1918 in Cologne, Germany
- Founder: Franz Baumgartner
- Number of locations: 5
- Area served: Worldwide
- Key people: Franz Baumgartner – Founder; Christian Leeser - CEO
- Products: Position sensors and motion sensors
- Brands: POSITAL, VITECTOR, UBITO, CREDEMUS
- Number of employees: 220 worldwide (2018)
- Website: fraba.com

FRABA is a worldwide company founded in Germany. The company manufactures products for fabrication and process automation and is specialized in sensor manufacturing, for example sensors which are used in windmills and heavy machinery. The company holds several patents of encoder innovation. Until the 1960s, FRABA's main product was mechanical relays. In 1963 the company started selling brush rotary encoders, leading to the development of the first optical rotary encoder in 1973 and the magnetic multi-turn rotary encoder in 2007.

== History ==
=== FRABA 1918-1943 ===
FRABA was founded by Franz Baumgartner in 1918 as the FRABA Fabrik elektr. Apparate. In the same year, Franz Baumgartner received his first patent for a "Petri Switch". This patent would be the first of many. The company specialized in producing mechanical relays for electrical alarm and safety devices. Until 1943, the company was based in Cologne-Klettenberg with two departments. From 1919 onward, the production and manufacturing expanded. Franz Baumgartner's brother, Adolf Baumgartner, was a key figure in the family company, leading one of the two departments and writing numerous technical articles on FRABA's products in several magazines and gazettes in the years to come.

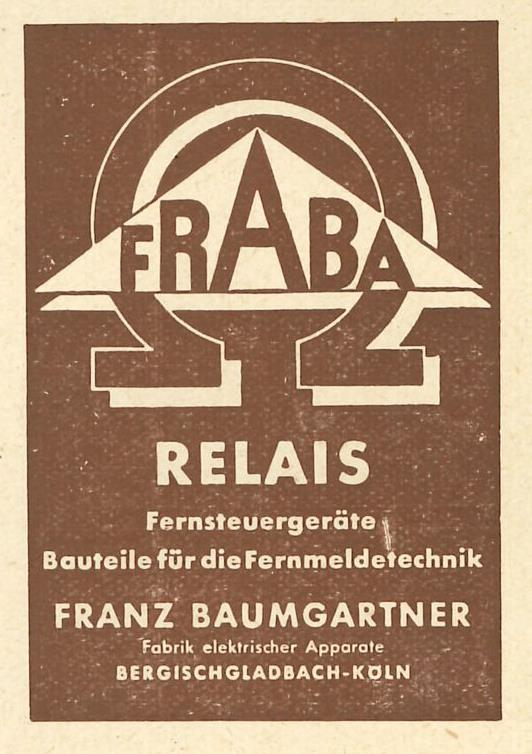
FRABA advertisement (Die Elektro-Post: 1952)

The firm was thriving in the 1920s and 1930s, with expanding export despite the economic crisis of 1929. Several different relays, such as electro-magnetic and mechanical ones, were produced in series and FRABA pioneered in making relays used in traffic regulations. In 1930 glass-blowing facilities were incorporated into the company. The glass was used as a switching mechanism. Towards the late 1920s other types of relays were developed and FRABA was a forerunner in remote-control systems. It was a sensation when in 1928, FRABA was commissioned by the mayor of Cologne, Konrad Adenauer, to build the remote-control systems for the public street lights in Cologne. The cities Mainz, Munich and Duisburg followed. One person could flip a switch and turn on the lights for the whole city. The importance of the relay switch in those years can be compared to the modern-day microchip.

=== FRABA 1943-1968 ===
By the beginning of the 1940s, the company offered a varied and broad spectrum of products. Due to World War II, the enterprise at Cologne-Klettenberg is destroyed and the parent company is moved to Brüchermühle, but in 1945 production stagnates. In 1946 Franz Baumgartner reopens, with only 10 employees left, a new factory in Bergisch Gladbach. FRABA expands and actively participated in the postwar German Wirthschaftswunder with the restart of production, newly established contacts with foreign customers and further expansion of their domestic business. In 1951 FRABA was the biggest specialized factory in Germany for electrical switching devices. This was a result of the innovative character of the company, e.g. during World War II, a gas pressure relay with quicksilver was invented instead of using the familiar copper wires, because copper was very hard to come by. FRABA flourished and relocated to the newly established operating space in Cologne-Niehl in 1953.

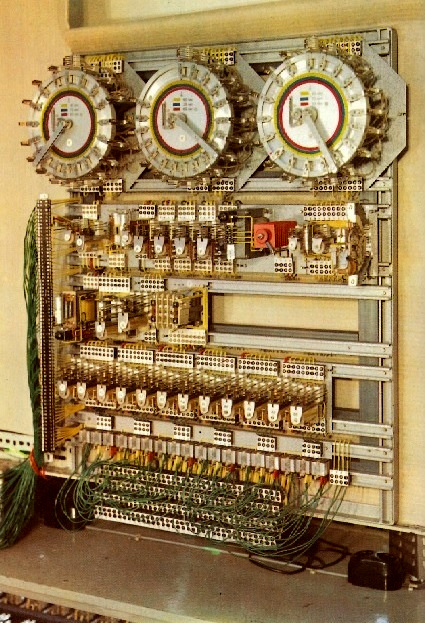
FB 18 - Special instrument for coordinated controllers without a connection (circular guidance installation) (1960s)

Until the 1960s, FRABA's main product was the mechanical relay. In 1960 FRABA modified their production and started manufacturing the first mobile dialysis system for hospitals. They continued to produce relays as well, such as specific systems for the German railway and relay combination systems for traffic lights. An example of the latter was the manufacturing of the relays for the traffic lights of Haifa in 1962. In February 1962, a large fire damaged the office and the production space of FRABA at Cologne-Niehl. However, this was not the end of the production: in 1963 FRABA launched their first (brush) absolute rotary encoder – a product which would remain the main business. In 1968, the company celebrated 50 years of FRABA and was thriving with 400 employees. In the same year, Franz Baumgartner retired at the age of 80. Two nephews took over the company. In 1969, Franz Baumgartner received the Federal Cross of Merit (Bundesverdienstkreuz), in honour of his work for the disabled and severely ill. Franz Baumgartner proved his high technical skill and knowledge, innovative character and entrepreneurial awareness.

=== FRABA 1968-1993 ===
The medical department is sold in 1970 and the attention turns towards the encoders. In 1973, one of the first non-contact, optical absolute rotary encoders was developed in the FRABA offices in Cologne. Afterwards, the company expands the portfolio of the encoders, adding new mechanical designs and electrical interfaces. Furthermore, magnetic elevator switches were produced. Regrettably, due to some less fortunate decisions, FRABA misses certain changes and loses connection to newly established technologies, such as transistors.

=== FRABA 1993-Present ===
In 1993 the brothers Christian and Achim Leeser along with Axel Wiemann acquired FRABA, which was practically bankrupt with a workforce of 114 persons. They had to reduce the workforce dramatically and discontinue or divest businesses. In 1994 FRABA launched the first opto-electronic safety edge (OSE). In the second half of the 1990s, FRABA focused on and invested in higher educated people. In 1998, the turnaround into a new business venture was completed. The firm was restructured into a group of independent companies combined by a common mission and guiding principles. Since 1997 the company is growing on average by 10% per annum with POSITAL (stands for POSItion digiTAL) industrial encoders and VITECTOR (stands for VITa protECTOR) door safety sensors. Over the years FRABA opened subsidiaries and relocated business. In August 2000 the first foreign subsidiary opened in Princeton, USA. In 2007 FRABA opened their manufacturing plant CONISTICS in Slubice, Poland and the brand POSITAL launches a new line of magnetic multiturn encoders based on a Wiegand Wire Energy Harvesting Technology. The first Asian subsidiary was opened in 2009 in Singapore. In 2011 the R&D department of FRABA, CENTITECH moved to Aachen, Germany and FRABA Holding office opened in Heerlen, The Netherlands. The workforce grew to 120 people. In 2014 the business system of "Mass Customization" is launched and the company acquired wire-conditioning machinery and intellectual property from the Wiegand estate. This leads to a reliable supply of Wiegand wire which improves the manufacturing process and exceptional product quality. A year later the Shanghai office is opened by POSITAL. Before its 100-Year Anniversary in 2018, the company produced and shipped 0.5 Million Wiegand Components to customers all over the world.

== Brands Under FRABA ==
FRABA designs and markets position and motion sensors. These products are used e. g. from manufacturing to mining, agriculture to energy. Products include magnetic and optical rotary encoders, inclinometers, linear position sensors, kit encoder and Wiegand sensors.

POSITAL is a manufacturer of sensors for motion control and safety assurance systems. The company's products, which include rotary encoders, inclinometers and linear position sensors, are used in a wide range of settings, from manufacturing to mining, agriculture to energy. POSITAL is a member of the international FRABA Group.

UBITO is a new brand of the FRABA Group.

CREDEMUS includes production management software, order fulfillment platform, and consulting support.

CODORMO makes safety systems for industrial doors.

VITECTOR the company produces safety sensors for doors. The product portfolio includes optical and pneumatic sensing edges, bumpers, and photo-eye sensors which meet international standards for safety devices. These products have applications in commercial, bus, and train doors as well as production machines. VITECTOR was acquired by CEDES in 2022.

== See also ==
- Rotary encoder
- Relay
