= Kyboe =

Dutch Fashion Brand

KYBOE
- Type: Wholly Owned Subsidiary
- Industry: Watchmaking
- Founded: 2006
- Headquarters: The Hague, The Netherlands
- Key people: Dick Sijmons (founder, creator and owner)
- Products: Wristwatches and Silver Bracelets.
- Parent: Symons & Panchenko

KYBOE is a Dutch upscale fashion brand founded in 2007 by Dutchmen Dick Sijmons and Kees de Bruïne; it features watches with oversized dials and bright colors. In 2015, the company set up a U.S. based office in Boca Raton, Florida, when American investors Bell and Roos acquired a stake in the company.

In 2017 Dick Sijmons went back to The Hague and started his new company: Symons & Panchenko and added his brand KYBOE in 2019, after recovering his brand name and designs.

== History ==
Dick Sijmons began making bright, colorful and fashionable plastic watches in 2007, under the name Kyboe. After seeing a positive response within the Netherlands, the company expanded the offerings to include more durable stainless steel cases. By 2008 the plastic watches were phased out entirely.

KYBOE started selling in the US in 2016.

== New partnership ==
American M. Bell joined KYBOE in 2014 as a distributor, and in 2015 became a partner. Bell brought business partner Joseph Roos, an expert in retail and finance, in to the partnership.

KYBOE's new Headoffice back where it started, The Hague, The Netherlands.
