= Schiphol-Rijk =

- Interactive map of Schiphol-Rijk
- Coordinates: 52°16′48″N 4°45′24″E
- Country: Netherlands
- Province: North Holland
- Municipality: Haarlemmermeer
- Postal code: 1119
- Website: https://www.parkschipholrijk.nl/

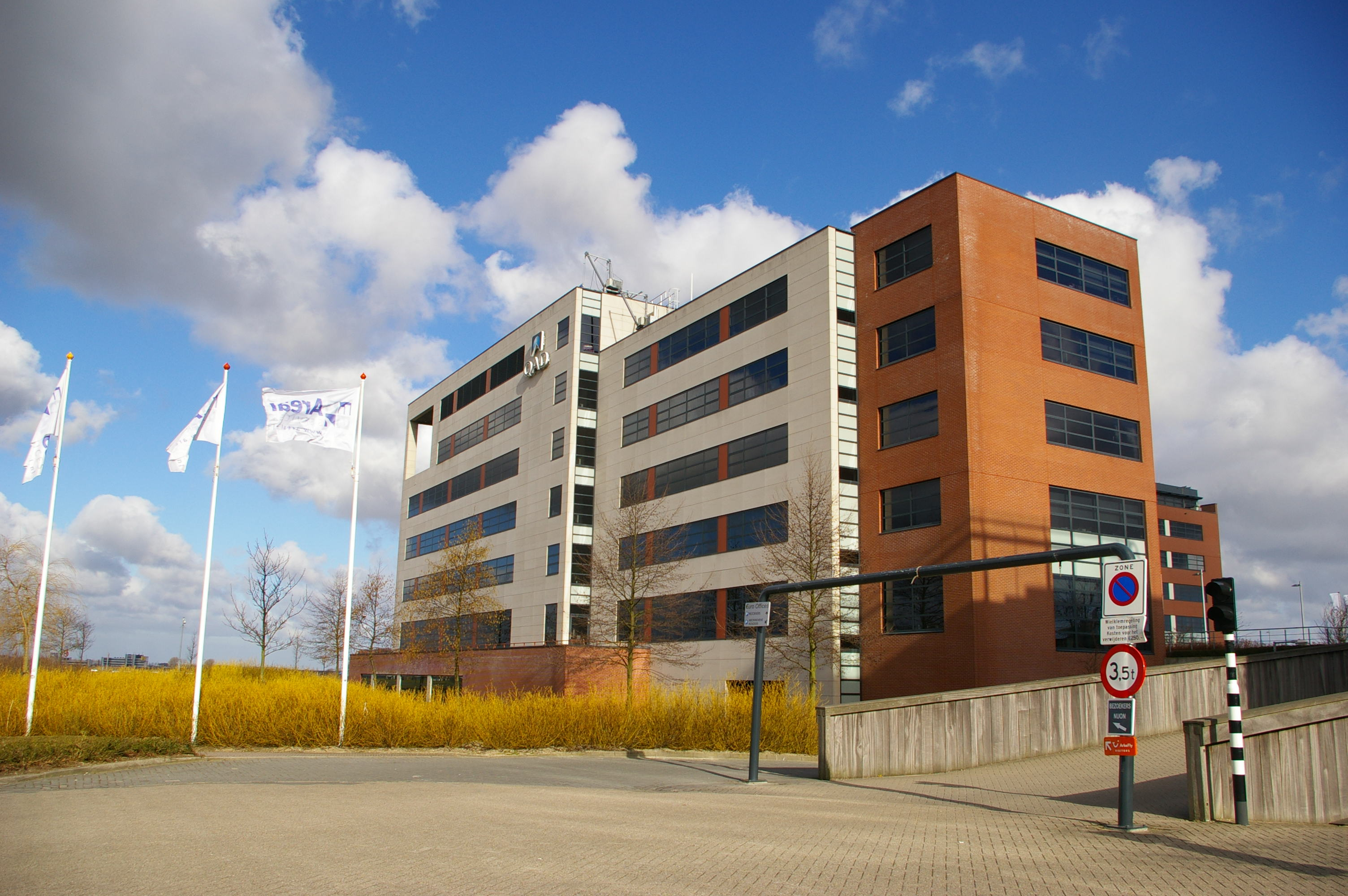
ArkeFly (now TUI fly Netherlands) head office

Schiphol-Rijk is an industrial estate in the Dutch province of North Holland. It is a part of Amsterdam Schiphol Airport and lies in the municipality of Haarlemmermeer. Schiphol-Rijk is named after the village Rijk that was demolished in the 1950s to make way for an extension of Schiphol Airport.

TUI fly Netherlands has its head office in Schiphol-Rijk. Before its dissolution, Amsterdam Airlines also had its head office in Schiphol-Rijk.
