= STOXX Europe 600 =

European stock market index

- STOXX Europe 600 since December 1986 (month-end closes, log scale)
- Foundation: June 15, 1998; 28 years ago
- Operator: STOXX Ltd.
- Exchanges: 17 exchanges including LSE, EPA, ETR, SWX
- Constituents: 600
- Type: Large-cap
- Market cap: €14.2 trillion (as of February 2025)
- Weighting method: Free-float capitalization-weighted
- Related indices: STOXX Europe 50
- Website: stoxx.com/index/sxxp/?factsheet=true

The STOXX Europe 600, also called STOXX 600, SXXP, is a stock index of European stocks designed by STOXX Ltd. This index has a fixed number of 600 components representing large-, mid- and small-capitalization companies among 17 European countries, covering approximately 90% of the free-float market capitalization of the European stock market (not limited to the Eurozone). The countries represented in the index as of 30 October 2026 are the United Kingdom, France, Germany, Switzerland, Sweden, Italy, the Netherlands, Spain, Denmark, Norway, Finland, Poland, Belgium, Greece, Austria, Ireland and Portugal.

The STOXX Europe 600 was introduced in 1998. Its composition is reviewed four times a year, in March, June, September, December. The index is available in several currencies (AUD, CAD, CHF, EUR, GBP, JPY, USD) and return (Price, Net Return, Gross Return) variant combinations.

It is licensed to financial institutions to serve as underlying for a wide range of investment products such as exchange-traded funds (ETFs), futures, options, and structured products worldwide.

== Methodology ==
The STOXX Europe 600 was launched on 15 June 1998 together with the first STOXX indices and has a base value of 100 as of 31 December 1991; values back to December 1986 have been calculated by STOXX. It covers the 600 largest companies of the developed European markets by free-float market capitalisation. The composition is reviewed quarterly, in March, June, September and December, using data as of the last trading day of the preceding month: for each company only the most liquid share line is considered, which must have a three-month average daily traded value above €1 million; the largest 550 eligible stocks are selected, and the remaining 50 places go to the largest current components ranked between 551 and 750. Each component is capped at 20% of the index.

With the review effective 21 September 2026, Greece was reclassified as a developed market and Greek companies became eligible for inclusion; nine of them entered the index, including the country's four largest banks.

== Development ==
The following table shows the end-of-year values of the STOXX Europe 600 index since 1998.

The index's closing high during the dot-com bubble, 405.50 points on 6 March 2000, was first surpassed on 9 April 2015. Its record close is 660.51 points, reached on 11 August 2026.

Year	No. of points	Change (points)	Change (%)
1998	279.20		
1999	379.49	100.29	35.92
2000	359.79	−19.70	−5.19
2001	298.73	−61.06	−16.97
2002	201.72	−97.01	−32.47
2003	229.31	27.59	13.68
2004	251.02	21.71	9.47
2005	310.03	59.01	23.51
2006	365.26	55.23	17.81
2007	364.64	−0.62	−0.17
2008	196.90	−167.74	−46.00
2009	253.16	56.26	28.57
2010	275.81	22.65	8.95
2011	244.54	−31.27	−11.34
2012	279.68	35.14	14.37
2013	328.26	48.58	17.37
2014	342.54	14.28	4.35
2015	365.81	23.27	6.79
2016	361.42	−4.39	−1.20
2017	389.18	27.76	7.68
2018	337.65	−51.53	−13.24
2019	415.84	78.19	23.16
2020	399.03	−16.81	−4.04
2021	487.80	88.77	22.25
2022	424.89	−62.91	−12.90
2023	479.02	54.13	12.74

== Sector index ==
Versions differentiating specific sector, respectively, are also available. Sector's classification is based on Industry Classification Benchmark.

- STOXX Europe 600 Health Care (SXDP)
- STOXX Europe 600 Industrial Goods & Services (SXNP)
- STOXX Europe 600 Food & Beverage (SX3P)
- STOXX Europe 600 Banks (SX7P)
- STOXX Europe 600 Technology (SX8P)
- STOXX Europe 600 Personal & Household Goods (SXQP)
- STOXX Europe 600 Insurance (SXIP)
- STOXX Europe 600 Oil & Gas (SXEP)
- STOXX Europe 600 Chemicals (SX4P)
- STOXX Europe 600 Utilities (SX6P)
- STOXX Europe 600 Retail (SXRP)
- STOXX Europe 600 Telecommunications (SXKP)
- STOXX Europe 600 Construction & Materials (SXOP)
- STOXX Europe 600 Financial Services (SXFP)
- STOXX Europe 600 Real Estate (SX86P)
- STOXX Europe 600 Automobiles & Parts (SXAP)
- STOXX Europe 600 Basic Resources (SXPP)
- STOXX Europe 600 Media (SXMP)
- STOXX Europe 600 Travel & Leisure (SXTP)

== Index components ==
The following table lists the companies in the index as of 30 October 2026. With the quarterly review effective 21 September 2026, 14 companies were added, nine of them Greek, and 14 were removed. The list also reflects replacements following corporate actions up to 30 October 2026: Schroders, acquired by Nuveen, and Beazley, acquired by Zurich Insurance Group, both on 1 October 2026, left the index. InPost and Telecom Italia are also no longer included; the four companies were replaced by Vontobel, Hill & Smith, OTE and B&M. Country and supersector are as assigned by STOXX; ISINs are taken from the holdings of a fund tracking the index. Tickers and ISINs link to each stock's page on the website of its main listing exchange.

Company	Ticker	ISIN	Main listing	Country	Supersector
3i	III	GB00B1YW4409	London Stock Exchange	United Kingdom	Financial Services
A2A	A2A	IT0001233417	Borsa Italiana	Italy	Utilities
AAK	AAK	SE0011337708	Nasdaq Stockholm	Sweden	Food, Beverage and Tobacco
Aalberts	AALB	NL0000852564	Euronext	Netherlands	Industrial Goods and Services
AB InBev	ABI	BE0974293251	Euronext	Belgium	Food, Beverage and Tobacco
ABB	ABBN	CH0012221716	SIX Swiss Exchange	Switzerland	Industrial Goods and Services
Aberdeen Group	ABDN	GB00BF8Q6K64	London Stock Exchange	United Kingdom	Financial Services
Abivax	ABVX	FR0012333284	Euronext	France	Healthcare
ABN AMRO	ABN	NL0011540547	Euronext	Netherlands	Banks
Accelleron Industries AG	ACLN	CH1169360919	SIX Swiss Exchange	Switzerland	Industrial Goods and Services
Acciona	ANA	ES0125220311	Bolsa de Madrid	Spain	Construction and Materials
Accor	AC	FR0000120404	Euronext	France	Travel and Leisure
Acerinox	ACX	ES0132105018	Bolsa de Madrid	Spain	Basic Resources
Ackermans & van Haaren	ACKB	BE0003764785	Euronext	Belgium	Construction and Materials
ACS Group	ACS	ES0167050915	Bolsa de Madrid	Spain	Construction and Materials
Addtech	ADDT B	SE0014781795	Nasdaq Stockholm	Sweden	Industrial Goods and Services
Adecco	ADEN	CH0012138605	SIX Swiss Exchange	Switzerland	Industrial Goods and Services
Adidas	ADS	DE000A1EWWW0	Frankfurt Stock Exchange	Germany	Consumer Products and Services
Admiral Group	ADM	GB00B02J6398	London Stock Exchange	United Kingdom	Insurance
Adyen	ADYEN	NL0012969182	Euronext	Netherlands	Industrial Goods and Services
Aedifica	AED	BE0003851681	Euronext	Belgium	Real Estate
Aegon	AGN	BMG0112X1056	Euronext	Netherlands	Insurance
Aena	AENA	ES0105046017	Bolsa de Madrid	Spain	Industrial Goods and Services
Ageas	AGS	BE0974264930	Euronext	Belgium	Insurance
Ahold Delhaize	AD	NL0011794037	Euronext	Netherlands	Personal Care, Drug and Grocery Stores
Air Liquide	AI	FR0000120073	Euronext	France	Chemicals
Airbus	AIR	NL0000235190	Euronext	France	Industrial Goods and Services
Airtel Africa	AAF	GB00BKDRYJ47	London Stock Exchange	United Kingdom	Telecommunications
Aixtron	AIXA	DE000A0WMPJ6	Frankfurt Stock Exchange	Germany	Technology
Aker ASA	AKER	NO0010234552	Euronext	Norway	Financial Services
Aker BP	AKRBP	NO0010345853	Euronext	Norway	Energy
AkzoNobel	AKZA	NL0013267909	Euronext	Netherlands	Chemicals
Alcon	ALC	CH0432492467	SIX Swiss Exchange	Switzerland	Healthcare
Alfa Laval	ALFA	SE0000695876	Nasdaq Stockholm	Sweden	Industrial Goods and Services
ALK-Abelló	ALK B	DK0061802139	Nasdaq Copenhagen	Denmark	Healthcare
Allegro SA	ALE	LU2237380790	Warsaw Stock Exchange	Poland	Consumer Products and Services
Allfunds	ALLFG	GB00BNTJ3546	Euronext	Netherlands	Financial Services
Allianz	ALV	DE0008404005	Frankfurt Stock Exchange	Germany	Insurance
Allied Irish Banks	A5G	IE00BF0L3536	Euronext	Ireland	Banks
Allreal Holding AG	ALLN	CH0008837566	SIX Swiss Exchange	Switzerland	Real Estate
Alpha Bank	ALPHA	GRS830003000	Euronext Athens	Greece	Banks
Alstom	ALO	FR0010220475	Euronext	France	Industrial Goods and Services
Amadeus IT Group	AMS	ES0109067019	Bolsa de Madrid	Spain	Technology
Amundi	AMUN	FR0004125920	Euronext	France	Financial Services
Andritz AG	ANDR	AT0000730007	Wiener Börse	Austria	Industrial Goods and Services
Anglo American plc	AAL	GB00BTK05J60	London Stock Exchange	United Kingdom	Basic Resources
Antofagasta plc	ANTO	GB0000456144	London Stock Exchange	United Kingdom	Basic Resources
Arcadis	ARCAD	NL0006237562	Euronext	Netherlands	Construction and Materials
ArcelorMittal	MT	LU1598757687	Euronext	France	Basic Resources
Argenx	ARGX	NL0010832176	Euronext	Belgium	Healthcare
Arkema	AKE	FR0010313833	Euronext	France	Chemicals
ASM International	ASM	NL0000334118	Euronext	Netherlands	Technology
ASML	ASML	NL0010273215	Euronext	Netherlands	Technology
ASR Nederland	ASRNL	NL0011872643	Euronext	Netherlands	Insurance
Assa Abloy	ASSA B	SE0007100581	Nasdaq Stockholm	Sweden	Construction and Materials
Asseco	ACP	PLSOFTB00016	Warsaw Stock Exchange	Poland	Technology
Assicurazioni Generali	G	IT0000062072	Borsa Italiana	Italy	Insurance
Associated British Foods	ABF	GB0006731235	London Stock Exchange	United Kingdom	Food, Beverage and Tobacco
AstraZeneca	AZN	GB0009895292	London Stock Exchange	United Kingdom	Healthcare
AT&S	ATS	AT0000969985	Wiener Börse	Austria	Technology
Atlas Copco	ATCO A	SE0017486889	Nasdaq Stockholm	Sweden	Industrial Goods and Services
Aurubis	NDA	DE0006766504	Frankfurt Stock Exchange	Germany	Basic Resources
AUTO1 Group	AG1	DE000A2LQ884	Frankfurt Stock Exchange	Germany	Retail
Autotrader Group	AUTO	GB00BVYVFW23	London Stock Exchange	United Kingdom	Technology
Avanza	AZA	SE0012454072	Nasdaq Stockholm	Sweden	Banks
Aviva	AV.	GB00BPQY8M80	London Stock Exchange	United Kingdom	Insurance
Avolta	AVOL	CH0023405456	SIX Swiss Exchange	Switzerland	Retail
Axa	CS	FR0000120628	Euronext	France	Insurance
Axfood	AXFO	SE0006993770	Nasdaq Stockholm	Sweden	Personal Care, Drug and Grocery Stores
Ayvens	AYV	FR0013258662	Euronext	France	Consumer Products and Services
Azimut Holding	AZM	IT0003261697	Borsa Italiana	Italy	Financial Services
B&M	BME	JE00BVSYJW51	London Stock Exchange	United Kingdom	Retail
Babcock International	BAB	GB0009697037	London Stock Exchange	United Kingdom	Industrial Goods and Services
BAE Systems	BA.	GB0002634946	London Stock Exchange	United Kingdom	Industrial Goods and Services
Balder	BALD B	SE0017832488	Nasdaq Stockholm	Sweden	Real Estate
Balfour Beatty	BBY	GB0000961622	London Stock Exchange	United Kingdom	Construction and Materials
Banca Generali	BGN	IT0001031084	Borsa Italiana	Italy	Banks
Banca Mediolanum	BMED	IT0004776628	Borsa Italiana	Italy	Financial Services
Banca Monte dei Paschi di Siena	BMPS	IT0005508921	Borsa Italiana	Italy	Banks
Banco Bilbao Vizcaya Argentaria	BBVA	ES0113211835	Bolsa de Madrid	Spain	Banks
Banco BPM	BAMI	IT0005218380	Borsa Italiana	Italy	Banks
Banco Comercial Português	BCP	PTBCP0AM0015	Euronext	Portugal	Banks
Banco Sabadell	SAB	ES0113860A34	Bolsa de Madrid	Spain	Banks
Banco Santander	SAN	ES0113900J37	Bolsa de Madrid	Spain	Banks
Bank Millennium	MIL	PLBIG0000016	Warsaw Stock Exchange	Poland	Banks
Bank of Ireland	BIRG	IE00BD1RP616	Euronext	Ireland	Banks
Bank Polska Kasa Opieki	PEO	PLPEKAO00016	Warsaw Stock Exchange	Poland	Banks
Bankinter	BKT	ES0113679I37	Bolsa de Madrid	Spain	Banks
Banque Cantonale Vaudoise	BCVN	CH0531751755	SIX Swiss Exchange	Switzerland	Banks
Barclays	BARC	GB0031348658	London Stock Exchange	United Kingdom	Banks
Barratt Redrow	BTRW	GB0000811801	London Stock Exchange	United Kingdom	Consumer Products and Services
Barry Callebaut	BARN	CH0009002962	SIX Swiss Exchange	Switzerland	Food, Beverage and Tobacco
BASF	BAS	DE000BASF111	Frankfurt Stock Exchange	Germany	Chemicals
BAWAG PSK	BG	AT0000BAWAG2	Wiener Börse	Austria	Banks
Bayer	BAYN	DE000BAY0017	Frankfurt Stock Exchange	Germany	Healthcare
Bechtle	BC8	DE0005158703	Frankfurt Stock Exchange	Germany	Technology
Beiersdorf	BEI	DE0005200000	Frankfurt Stock Exchange	Germany	Personal Care, Drug and Grocery Stores
Beijer Ref	BEIJ B	SE0015949748	Nasdaq Stockholm	Sweden	Construction and Materials
BELIMO Holding	BEAN	CH1101098163	SIX Swiss Exchange	Switzerland	Construction and Materials
Bellway	BWY	GB0000904986	London Stock Exchange	United Kingdom	Consumer Products and Services
Benefit Systems	BFT	PLBNFTS00018	Warsaw Stock Exchange	Poland	Industrial Goods and Services
Berkeley Group Holdings	BKG	GB00BP0RGD03	London Stock Exchange	United Kingdom	Consumer Products and Services
Besi	BESI	NL0012866412	Euronext	Netherlands	Technology
Bilfinger	GBF	DE0005909006	Frankfurt Stock Exchange	Germany	Construction and Materials
BioMérieux	BIM	FR0013280286	Euronext	France	Healthcare
BKW Energie	BKW	CH0130293662	SIX Swiss Exchange	Switzerland	Utilities
BMW	BMW	DE0005190003	Frankfurt Stock Exchange	Germany	Automobiles and Parts
BNP Paribas	BNP	FR0000131104	Euronext	France	Banks
Boliden AB	BOL	SE0020050417	Nasdaq Stockholm	Sweden	Basic Resources
Bolloré	BOL	FR0000039299	Euronext	France	Media
Bouygues	EN	FR0000120503	Euronext	France	Construction and Materials
BP	BP.	GB0007980591	London Stock Exchange	United Kingdom	Energy
BPER Banca	BPE	IT0000066123	Borsa Italiana	Italy	Banks
Brenntag	BNR	DE000A1DAHH0	Frankfurt Stock Exchange	Germany	Chemicals
Bridgepoint Group	BPT	GB00BND88V85	London Stock Exchange	United Kingdom	Financial Services
British American Tobacco	BATS	GB0002875804	London Stock Exchange	United Kingdom	Food, Beverage and Tobacco
British Land	BLND	GB0001367019	London Stock Exchange	United Kingdom	Real Estate
Brunello Cucinelli	BC	IT0004764699	Borsa Italiana	Italy	Consumer Products and Services
BT Group	BT.A	GB0030913577	London Stock Exchange	United Kingdom	Telecommunications
Bunzl	BNZL	GB00B0744B38	London Stock Exchange	United Kingdom	Industrial Goods and Services
Burberry	BRBY	GB0031743007	London Stock Exchange	United Kingdom	Consumer Products and Services
Bureau Veritas	BVI	FR0006174348	Euronext	France	Industrial Goods and Services
Buzzi Unicem	BZU	IT0001347308	Borsa Italiana	Italy	Construction and Materials
CaixaBank	CABK	ES0140609019	Bolsa de Madrid	Spain	Banks
Campari Group	CPR	NL0015435975	Borsa Italiana	Italy	Food, Beverage and Tobacco
Capgemini	CAP	FR0000125338	Euronext	France	Technology
Carlsberg Group	CARL B	DK0010181759	Nasdaq Copenhagen	Denmark	Food, Beverage and Tobacco
Castellum	CAST	SE0000379190	Nasdaq Stockholm	Sweden	Real Estate
CD Projekt Red	CDR	PLOPTTC00011	Warsaw Stock Exchange	Poland	Consumer Products and Services
Cellnex	CLNX	ES0105066007	Bolsa de Madrid	Spain	Telecommunications
Cembra Money Bank	CMBN	CH0225173167	SIX Swiss Exchange	Switzerland	Banks
Centrica	CNA	GB00B033F229	London Stock Exchange	United Kingdom	Utilities
Coca-Cola HBC	CCH	CH0198251305	London Stock Exchange	United Kingdom	Food, Beverage and Tobacco
Coloplast	COLO B	DK0060448595	Nasdaq Copenhagen	Denmark	Healthcare
Comet Holding AG	COTN	CH0360826991	SIX Swiss Exchange	Switzerland	Technology
Commerzbank	CBK	DE000CBK1001	Frankfurt Stock Exchange	Germany	Banks
Compass Group	CPG	GB00BD6K4575	London Stock Exchange	United Kingdom	Consumer Products and Services
Computacenter	CCC	GB00BV9FP302	London Stock Exchange	United Kingdom	Technology
Continental AG	CON	DE0005439004	Frankfurt Stock Exchange	Germany	Automobiles and Parts
Convatec	CTEC	GB00BD3VFW73	London Stock Exchange	United Kingdom	Healthcare
Covivio	COV	FR0000064578	Euronext	France	Real Estate
Cranswick plc	CWK	GB0002318888	London Stock Exchange	United Kingdom	Food, Beverage and Tobacco
Crédit Agricole	ACA	FR0000045072	Euronext	France	Banks
Croda International	CRDA	GB00BJFFLV09	London Stock Exchange	United Kingdom	Chemicals
CSG	CSG	NL0015073TS8	Euronext	Netherlands	Industrial Goods and Services
CTS Eventim	EVD	DE0005470306	Frankfurt Stock Exchange	Germany	Media
CVC Capital Partners	CVC	JE00BRX98089	Euronext	Netherlands	Financial Services
D'Ieteren Group	DIE	BE0974259880	Euronext	Belgium	Automobiles and Parts
Daimler Truck	DTG	DE000DTR0CK8	Frankfurt Stock Exchange	Germany	Industrial Goods and Services
Danone	BN	FR0000120644	Euronext	France	Food, Beverage and Tobacco
Danske Bank	DANSKE	DK0010274414	Nasdaq Copenhagen	Denmark	Banks
Dassault Aviation	AM	FR0014004L86	Euronext	France	Industrial Goods and Services
Dassault Systèmes	DSY	FR0014003TT8	Euronext	France	Technology
DCC Energy	DCC	IE0002424939	London Stock Exchange	United Kingdom	Industrial Goods and Services
De' Longhi	DLG	IT0003115950	Borsa Italiana	Italy	Consumer Products and Services
Delivery Hero	DHER	DE000A2E4K43	Frankfurt Stock Exchange	Germany	Consumer Products and Services
Demant	DEMANT	DK0060738599	Nasdaq Copenhagen	Denmark	Healthcare
Derwent London	DLN	GB0002652740	London Stock Exchange	United Kingdom	Real Estate
Deutsche Bank	DBK	DE0005140008	Frankfurt Stock Exchange	Germany	Banks
Deutsche Börse	DB1	DE0005810055	Frankfurt Stock Exchange	Germany	Financial Services
Deutsche Telekom	DTE	DE0005557508	Frankfurt Stock Exchange	Germany	Telecommunications
DHL Group	DHL	DE0005552004	Frankfurt Stock Exchange	Germany	Industrial Goods and Services
Diageo	DGE	GB0002374006	London Stock Exchange	United Kingdom	Food, Beverage and Tobacco
Dino Polska	DNP	PLDINPL00011	Warsaw Stock Exchange	Poland	Personal Care, Drug and Grocery Stores
Diploma plc	DPLM	GB0001826634	London Stock Exchange	United Kingdom	Industrial Goods and Services
DKSH	DKSH	CH0126673539	SIX Swiss Exchange	Switzerland	Industrial Goods and Services
DNB Bank	DNB	NO0010161896	Euronext	Norway	Banks
Drax Group	DRX	GB00B1VNSX38	London Stock Exchange	United Kingdom	Utilities
DSM-Firmenich	DSFIR	CH1216478797	Euronext	Netherlands	Food, Beverage and Tobacco
DSV	DSV	DK0060079531	Nasdaq Copenhagen	Denmark	Industrial Goods and Services
E.ON	EOAN	DE000ENAG999	Frankfurt Stock Exchange	Germany	Utilities
EasyJet	EZJ	GB00B7KR2P84	London Stock Exchange	United Kingdom	Travel and Leisure
Edenred	EDEN	FR0010908533	Euronext	France	Industrial Goods and Services
EDP Group	EDP	PTEDP0AM0009	Euronext	Portugal	Utilities
EDP Renováveis	EDPR	ES0127797019	Euronext	Portugal	Utilities
Eiffage	FGR	FR0000130452	Euronext	France	Construction and Materials
Elia Transmission Belgium	ELI	BE0003822393	Euronext	Belgium	Utilities
Elis	ELIS	FR0012435121	Euronext	France	Industrial Goods and Services
Elisa	ELISA	FI0009007884	Nasdaq Helsinki	Finland	Telecommunications
Ems-Chemie	EMSN	CH0016440353	SIX Swiss Exchange	Switzerland	Chemicals
Enagás	ENG	ES0130960018	Bolsa de Madrid	Spain	Energy
Endeavour Mining	EDV	GB00BL6K5J42	London Stock Exchange	United Kingdom	Basic Resources
Endesa	ELE	ES0130670112	Bolsa de Madrid	Spain	Utilities
Enel	ENEL	IT0003128367	Borsa Italiana	Italy	Utilities
Engie	ENGI	FR0010208488	Euronext	France	Utilities
Eni	ENI	IT0003132476	Borsa Italiana	Italy	Energy
Entain	ENT	IM00B5VQMV65	London Stock Exchange	United Kingdom	Travel and Leisure
Epiroc	EPI A	SE0015658109	Nasdaq Stockholm	Sweden	Industrial Goods and Services
EQT AB	EQT	SE0012853455	Nasdaq Stockholm	Sweden	Financial Services
Equinor	EQNR	NO0010096985	Euronext	Norway	Energy
Ericsson	ERIC B	SE0000108656	Nasdaq Stockholm	Sweden	Telecommunications
Erste Bank Polska	EBP	PLBZ00000044	Warsaw Stock Exchange	Poland	Banks
Erste Group	EBS	AT0000652011	Wiener Börse	Austria	Banks
EssilorLuxottica	EL	FR0000121667	Euronext	France	Healthcare
Essity	ESSITY B	SE0009922164	Nasdaq Stockholm	Sweden	Personal Care, Drug and Grocery Stores
Eurobank Ergasias	EUROB	GRS829003003	Euronext Athens	Greece	Banks
Eurofins Scientific	ERF	FR0014000MR3	Euronext	France	Healthcare
Euronext	ENX	NL0006294274	Euronext	France	Financial Services
Evolution AB	EVO	SE0012673267	Nasdaq Stockholm	Sweden	Travel and Leisure
Evonik Industries	EVK	DE000EVNK013	Frankfurt Stock Exchange	Germany	Chemicals
Exor	EXO	NL0012059018	Euronext	Netherlands	Financial Services
Experian	EXPN	GB00B19NLV48	London Stock Exchange	United Kingdom	Industrial Goods and Services
FDJ United	FDJU	FR0013451333	Euronext	France	Travel and Leisure
Ferrari	RACE	NL0011585146	Borsa Italiana	Italy	Automobiles and Parts
Ferrovial	FER	NL0015001FS8	Bolsa de Madrid	Spain	Construction and Materials
Financière de Tubize	TUB	BE0003823409	Euronext	Belgium	Healthcare
FinecoBank	FBK	IT0000072170	Borsa Italiana	Italy	Banks
Flatexdegiro	FTK	DE000FTG1111	Frankfurt Stock Exchange	Germany	Financial Services
FLSmidth	FLS	DK0010234467	Nasdaq Copenhagen	Denmark	Construction and Materials
Flughafen Zürich AG	FHZN	CH0319416936	SIX Swiss Exchange	Switzerland	Industrial Goods and Services
Fortum	FORTUM	FI0009007132	Nasdaq Helsinki	Finland	Utilities
Freenet AG	FNTN	DE000A0Z2ZZ5	Frankfurt Stock Exchange	Germany	Telecommunications
Fresenius	FRE	DE000FRE5EN2	Frankfurt Stock Exchange	Germany	Healthcare
Fresenius Medical Care	FME	DE0005785802	Frankfurt Stock Exchange	Germany	Healthcare
Fresnillo plc	FRES	GB00B2QPKJ12	London Stock Exchange	United Kingdom	Basic Resources
Frontline Ltd.	FRO	CY0200352116	Euronext	Norway	Industrial Goods and Services
Fuchs SE (preferred shares)	FPE3	DE000A3E5D64	Frankfurt Stock Exchange	Germany	Chemicals
Galderma	GALD	CH1335392721	SIX Swiss Exchange	Switzerland	Healthcare
Galenica	GALE	CH0360674466	SIX Swiss Exchange	Switzerland	Personal Care, Drug and Grocery Stores
Galp Energia	GALP	PTGAL0AM0009	Euronext	Portugal	Energy
Games Workshop	GAW	GB0003718474	London Stock Exchange	United Kingdom	Consumer Products and Services
Gaztransport & Technigaz	GTT	FR0011726835	Euronext	France	Energy
GEA Group	G1A	DE0006602006	Frankfurt Stock Exchange	Germany	Industrial Goods and Services
Geberit	GEBN	CH0030170408	SIX Swiss Exchange	Switzerland	Construction and Materials
Gecina	GFC	FR0010040865	Euronext	France	Real Estate
GEK Terna	GEKTERNA	GRS145003000	Euronext Athens	Greece	Construction and Materials
Genmab	GMAB	DK0010272202	Nasdaq Copenhagen	Denmark	Healthcare
Georg Fischer	GF	CH1169151003	SIX Swiss Exchange	Switzerland	Construction and Materials
Getinge Group	GETI B	SE0000202624	Nasdaq Stockholm	Sweden	Healthcare
Getlink	GET	FR0010533075	Euronext	France	Industrial Goods and Services
Givaudan	GIVN	CH0010645932	SIX Swiss Exchange	Switzerland	Chemicals
Gjensidige	GJF	NO0010582521	Euronext	Norway	Insurance
Glanbia	GL9	IE0000669501	Euronext	Ireland	Food, Beverage and Tobacco
Glencore	GLEN	JE00B4T3BW64	London Stock Exchange	United Kingdom	Basic Resources
Grifols	GRF	ES0171996087	Bolsa de Madrid	Spain	Healthcare
Groupe ADP	ADP	FR0010340141	Euronext	France	Industrial Goods and Services
Groupe Bruxelles Lambert	GBLB	BE0003797140	Euronext	Belgium	Financial Services
Groupe Carrefour	CA	FR0000120172	Euronext	France	Personal Care, Drug and Grocery Stores
Grupa Kęty	KTY	PLKETY000011	Warsaw Stock Exchange	Poland	Basic Resources
GSK plc	GSK	GB00BN7SWP63	London Stock Exchange	United Kingdom	Healthcare
H&M	HM B	SE0000106270	Nasdaq Stockholm	Sweden	Retail
Haleon	HLN	GB00BMX86B70	London Stock Exchange	United Kingdom	Healthcare
Halma plc	HLMA	GB0004052071	London Stock Exchange	United Kingdom	Industrial Goods and Services
Handelsbanken	SHB A	SE0007100599	Nasdaq Stockholm	Sweden	Banks
Hannover Re	HNR1	DE0008402215	Frankfurt Stock Exchange	Germany	Insurance
Heidelberg Materials	HEI	DE0006047004	Frankfurt Stock Exchange	Germany	Construction and Materials
Heineken Holding	HEIO	NL0000008977	Euronext	Netherlands	Food, Beverage and Tobacco
Heineken N.V.	HEIA	NL0000009165	Euronext	Netherlands	Food, Beverage and Tobacco
Helvetia Insurance	HBAN	CH0466642201	SIX Swiss Exchange	Switzerland	Insurance
Henkel (preferred shares)	HEN3	DE0006048432	Frankfurt Stock Exchange	Germany	Chemicals
Hensoldt	HAG	DE000HAG0005	Frankfurt Stock Exchange	Germany	Industrial Goods and Services
Hera	HER	IT0001250932	Borsa Italiana	Italy	Utilities
Hermès	RMS	FR0000052292	Euronext	France	Consumer Products and Services
Hexagon AB	HEXA B	SE0015961909	Nasdaq Stockholm	Sweden	Technology
Hikma Pharmaceuticals	HIK	GB00B0LCW083	London Stock Exchange	United Kingdom	Healthcare
Hill & Smith	HILS	GB0004270301	London Stock Exchange	United Kingdom	Industrial Goods and Services
Hiscox	HSX	BMG4593F1389	London Stock Exchange	United Kingdom	Insurance
Hochschild Mining	HOC	GB00B1FW5029	London Stock Exchange	United Kingdom	Basic Resources
Hochtief	HOT	DE0006070006	Frankfurt Stock Exchange	Germany	Construction and Materials
Holcim Group	HOLN	CH0012214059	SIX Swiss Exchange	Switzerland	Construction and Materials
Holmen	HOLM B	SE0011090018	Nasdaq Stockholm	Sweden	Basic Resources
Howdens Joinery	HWDN	GB0005576813	London Stock Exchange	United Kingdom	Retail
HSBC	HSBA	GB0005405286	London Stock Exchange	United Kingdom	Banks
Huber + Suhner	HUBN	CH0030380734	SIX Swiss Exchange	Switzerland	Telecommunications
Huhtamäki	HUH1V	FI0009000459	Nasdaq Helsinki	Finland	Industrial Goods and Services
Hydrauliska Industri AB	HIAB	FI4000571013	Nasdaq Helsinki	Finland	Industrial Goods and Services
Iberdrola	IBE	ES0144580Y14	Bolsa de Madrid	Spain	Utilities
ICG plc	ICG	GB00BYT1DJ19	London Stock Exchange	United Kingdom	Financial Services
IG Group	IGG	GB00B06QFB75	London Stock Exchange	United Kingdom	Financial Services
IHG Hotels & Resorts	IHG	GB00BHJYC057	London Stock Exchange	United Kingdom	Travel and Leisure
IMCD NV	IMCD	NL0010801007	Euronext	Netherlands	Chemicals
IMI plc	IMI	GB00BGLP8L22	London Stock Exchange	United Kingdom	Industrial Goods and Services
Imperial Brands	IMB	GB0004544929	London Stock Exchange	United Kingdom	Food, Beverage and Tobacco
Inchcape plc	INCH	GB00B61TVQ02	London Stock Exchange	United Kingdom	Retail
Inditex	ITX	ES0148396007	Bolsa de Madrid	Spain	Retail
Indra Sistemas	IDR	ES0118594417	Bolsa de Madrid	Spain	Technology
Industrivärden	INDU C	SE0000107203	Nasdaq Stockholm	Sweden	Financial Services
Indutrade	INDT	SE0001515552	Nasdaq Stockholm	Sweden	Industrial Goods and Services
INFICON	IFCN	CH1431598916	SIX Swiss Exchange	Switzerland	Industrial Goods and Services
Infineon Technologies	IFX	DE0006231004	Frankfurt Stock Exchange	Germany	Technology
Informa	INF	GB00BMJ6DW54	London Stock Exchange	United Kingdom	Media
ING Bank Śląski	ING	PLBSK0000017	Warsaw Stock Exchange	Poland	Banks
ING Group	INGA	NL0011821202	Euronext	Netherlands	Banks
International Airlines Group	IAG	ES0177542018	London Stock Exchange	United Kingdom	Travel and Leisure
Interpump Group	IP	IT0001078911	Borsa Italiana	Italy	Industrial Goods and Services
Intertek	ITRK	GB0031638363	London Stock Exchange	United Kingdom	Industrial Goods and Services
Intesa Sanpaolo	ISP	IT0000072618	Borsa Italiana	Italy	Banks
Investec	INVP	GB00B17BBQ50	London Stock Exchange	United Kingdom	Banks
Investment AB Latour	LATO B	SE0010100958	Nasdaq Stockholm	Sweden	Industrial Goods and Services
Investor AB	INVE B	SE0015811963	Nasdaq Stockholm	Sweden	Financial Services
Ipsen	IPN	FR0010259150	Euronext	France	Healthcare
ISS A/S	ISS	DK0060542181	Nasdaq Copenhagen	Denmark	Industrial Goods and Services
Italgas	IG	IT0005211237	Borsa Italiana	Italy	Utilities
ITV plc	ITV	GB0033986497	London Stock Exchange	United Kingdom	Media
Iveco Group	IVG	NL0015000LU4	Borsa Italiana	Italy	Industrial Goods and Services
Jerónimo Martins	JMT	PTJMT0AE0001	Euronext	Portugal	Personal Care, Drug and Grocery Stores
Johnson Matthey	JMAT	GB00BTQHVY80	London Stock Exchange	United Kingdom	Chemicals
Julius Baer Group	BAER	CH0102484968	SIX Swiss Exchange	Switzerland	Financial Services
Jumbo S.A.	BELA	GRS282183003	Euronext Athens	Greece	Retail
Jyske Bank	JYSK	DK0010307958	Nasdaq Copenhagen	Denmark	Banks
K+S	SDF	DE000KSAG888	Frankfurt Stock Exchange	Germany	Chemicals
KBC Ancora NV	KBCA	BE0003867844	Euronext	Belgium	Banks
KBC Group	KBC	BE0003565737	Euronext	Belgium	Banks
Kering	KER	FR0000121485	Euronext	France	Consumer Products and Services
Kerry Group	KRZ	IE0004906560	Euronext	Ireland	Food, Beverage and Tobacco
Kesko	KESKOB	FI0009000202	Nasdaq Helsinki	Finland	Personal Care, Drug and Grocery Stores
KGHM Polska Miedź	KGH	PLKGHM000017	Warsaw Stock Exchange	Poland	Basic Resources
Kingfisher plc	KGF	GB0033195214	London Stock Exchange	United Kingdom	Retail
Kingspan Group	KRX	IE0004927939	Euronext	Ireland	Construction and Materials
KION Group	KGX	DE000KGX8881	Frankfurt Stock Exchange	Germany	Industrial Goods and Services
Klépierre	LI	FR0000121964	Euronext	France	Real Estate
Knorr-Bremse	KBX	DE000KBX1006	Frankfurt Stock Exchange	Germany	Industrial Goods and Services
Kone	KNEBV	FI0009013403	Nasdaq Helsinki	Finland	Industrial Goods and Services
Konecranes	KCR	FI0009005870	Nasdaq Helsinki	Finland	Industrial Goods and Services
Kongsberg Gruppen	KOG	NO0013536151	Euronext	Norway	Industrial Goods and Services
KPN	KPN	NL0000009082	Euronext	Netherlands	Telecommunications
Kuehne + Nagel	KNIN	CH0025238863	SIX Swiss Exchange	Switzerland	Industrial Goods and Services
L E Lundbergföretagen	LUND B	SE0000108847	Nasdaq Stockholm	Sweden	Financial Services
L'Oréal	OR	FR0000120321	Euronext	France	Consumer Products and Services
Lagercrantz Group	LAGR B	SE0014990966	Nasdaq Stockholm	Sweden	Technology
Landsec	LAND	GB00BYW0PQ60	London Stock Exchange	United Kingdom	Real Estate
LEG Immobilien	LEG	DE000LEG1110	Frankfurt Stock Exchange	Germany	Real Estate
Legal & General	LGEN	GB0005603997	London Stock Exchange	United Kingdom	Insurance
Legrand	LR	FR0010307819	Euronext	France	Industrial Goods and Services
Leonardo S.p.A.	LDO	IT0003856405	Borsa Italiana	Italy	Industrial Goods and Services
Lifco	LIFCO B	SE0015949201	Nasdaq Stockholm	Sweden	Industrial Goods and Services
Lindt	LISP	CH0010570767	SIX Swiss Exchange	Switzerland	Food, Beverage and Tobacco
Lion Finance Group	BGEO	GB00BF4HYT85	London Stock Exchange	United Kingdom	Banks
Lloyds Banking Group	LLOY	GB0008706128	London Stock Exchange	United Kingdom	Banks
Logitech	LOGN	CH0025751329	SIX Swiss Exchange	Switzerland	Technology
London Stock Exchange	LSEG	GB00B0SWJX34	London Stock Exchange	United Kingdom	Financial Services
LondonMetric Property	LMP	GB00B4WFW713	London Stock Exchange	United Kingdom	Real Estate
Lonza Group	LONN	CH0013841017	SIX Swiss Exchange	Switzerland	Healthcare
Loomis	LOOMIS	SE0014504817	Nasdaq Stockholm	Sweden	Industrial Goods and Services
Lottomatica	LTMC	IT0005541336	Borsa Italiana	Italy	Travel and Leisure
Lotus Bakeries	LOTB	BE0003604155	Euronext	Belgium	Food, Beverage and Tobacco
LPP	LPP	PLLPP0000011	Warsaw Stock Exchange	Poland	Consumer Products and Services
Lufthansa Group	LHA	DE0008232125	Frankfurt Stock Exchange	Germany	Travel and Leisure
LVMH	MC	FR0000121014	Euronext	France	Consumer Products and Services
M&G	MNG	GB00BKFB1C65	London Stock Exchange	United Kingdom	Financial Services
Maersk	MAERSK B	DK0010244508	Nasdaq Copenhagen	Denmark	Industrial Goods and Services
Man Group	EMG	JE00BJ1DLW90	London Stock Exchange	United Kingdom	Financial Services
Mandatum	MANTA	FI4000552526	Nasdaq Helsinki	Finland	Financial Services
Mapfre	MAP	ES0124244E34	Bolsa de Madrid	Spain	Insurance
Marks & Spencer	MKS	GB0031274896	London Stock Exchange	United Kingdom	Personal Care, Drug and Grocery Stores
MBank	MBK	PLBRE0000012	Warsaw Stock Exchange	Poland	Banks
Melrose Industries	MRO	GB00BNGDN821	London Stock Exchange	United Kingdom	Industrial Goods and Services
Mercedes-Benz Group	MBG	DE0007100000	Frankfurt Stock Exchange	Germany	Automobiles and Parts
Merck Group	MRK	DE0006599905	Frankfurt Stock Exchange	Germany	Healthcare
Merlin Properties	MRL	ES0105025003	Bolsa de Madrid	Spain	Real Estate
Metlen Energy & Metals	MTLN	GB00BTQGS779	Euronext Athens	Greece	Utilities
Metso	METSO	FI0009014575	Nasdaq Helsinki	Finland	Industrial Goods and Services
Michelin	ML	FR001400AJ45	Euronext	France	Automobiles and Parts
Mitie	MTO	GB0004657408	London Stock Exchange	United Kingdom	Industrial Goods and Services
Mobimo Holding AG	MOBN	CH0011108872	SIX Swiss Exchange	Switzerland	Real Estate
Moncler	MONC	IT0004965148	Borsa Italiana	Italy	Consumer Products and Services
Mondi	MNDI	GB00BMWC6P49	London Stock Exchange	United Kingdom	Industrial Goods and Services
Motor Oil Hellas	MOH	GRS426003000	Euronext Athens	Greece	Energy
Mowi	MOWI	NO0003054108	Euronext	Norway	Food, Beverage and Tobacco
MTU Aero Engines	MTX	DE000A0D9PT0	Frankfurt Stock Exchange	Germany	Industrial Goods and Services
Munich Re	MUV2	DE0008430026	Frankfurt Stock Exchange	Germany	Insurance
Mycronic	MYCR	SE0025158629	Nasdaq Stockholm	Sweden	Technology
National Bank of Greece	ETE	GRS003003035	Euronext Athens	Greece	Banks
National Grid plc	NG.	GB00BDR05C01	London Stock Exchange	United Kingdom	Utilities
Naturgy	NTGY	ES0116870314	Bolsa de Madrid	Spain	Utilities
NatWest Group	NWG	GB00BM8PJY71	London Stock Exchange	United Kingdom	Banks
Nemetschek	NEM	DE0006452907	Frankfurt Stock Exchange	Germany	Technology
Neste	NESTE	FI0009013296	Nasdaq Helsinki	Finland	Energy
Nestlé	NESN	CH0038863350	SIX Swiss Exchange	Switzerland	Food, Beverage and Tobacco
Nexans	NEX	FR0000044448	Euronext	France	Industrial Goods and Services
Nexi	NEXI	IT0005366767	Borsa Italiana	Italy	Industrial Goods and Services
Next plc	NXT	GB0032089863	London Stock Exchange	United Kingdom	Retail
Nibe Industrier	NIBE B	SE0015988019	Nasdaq Stockholm	Sweden	Construction and Materials
NKT A/S	NKT	DK0010287663	Nasdaq Copenhagen	Denmark	Industrial Goods and Services
NN Group	NN	NL0010773842	Euronext	Netherlands	Insurance
Nokia	NOKIA	FI0009000681	Nasdaq Helsinki	Finland	Telecommunications
Nordea	NDA FI	FI4000297767	Nasdaq Helsinki	Finland	Banks
Nordex	NDX1	DE000A0D6554	Frankfurt Stock Exchange	Germany	Energy
Nordic Semiconductor	NOD	NO0003055501	Euronext	Norway	Technology
Nordnet	SAVE	SE0015192067	Nasdaq Stockholm	Sweden	Financial Services
Norsk Hydro	NHY	NO0005052605	Euronext	Norway	Basic Resources
Novartis	NOVN	CH0012005267	SIX Swiss Exchange	Switzerland	Healthcare
Novo Nordisk	NOVO B	DK0062498333	Nasdaq Copenhagen	Denmark	Healthcare
Novonesis	NSIS B	DK0060336014	Nasdaq Copenhagen	Denmark	Healthcare
Octave Intelligence Sdr PLC	OCTV SDB	SE0028329433	Nasdaq Stockholm	Sweden	Technology
OMV	OMV	AT0000743059	Wiener Börse	Austria	Energy
Orange Group	ORA	FR0000133308	Euronext	France	Telecommunications
Orion Corporation	ORNBV	FI0009014377	Nasdaq Helsinki	Finland	Healthcare
Orkla ASA	ORK	NO0003733800	Euronext	Norway	Food, Beverage and Tobacco
Orlen	PKN	PLPKN0000018	Warsaw Stock Exchange	Poland	Energy
Ørsted	ORSTED	DK0060094928	Nasdaq Copenhagen	Denmark	Utilities
OTE Group	HTO	GRS260333000	Euronext Athens	Greece	Telecommunications
Pan African Resources	PAF	GB0004300496	London Stock Exchange	United Kingdom	Basic Resources
Pandora	PNDORA	DK0060252690	Nasdaq Copenhagen	Denmark	Consumer Products and Services
Partners Group	PGHN	CH0024608827	SIX Swiss Exchange	Switzerland	Financial Services
Pearson plc	PSON	GB0006776081	London Stock Exchange	United Kingdom	Media
Pennon Group	PNN	GB00BNNTLN49	London Stock Exchange	United Kingdom	Utilities
Pernod Ricard	RI	FR0000120693	Euronext	France	Food, Beverage and Tobacco
Persimmon plc	PSN	GB0006825383	London Stock Exchange	United Kingdom	Consumer Products and Services
Philips	PHIA	NL0000009538	Euronext	Netherlands	Healthcare
Piraeus Bank	TPEIR	GRS831003009	Euronext Athens	Greece	Banks
Pirelli	PIRC	IT0005278236	Borsa Italiana	Italy	Automobiles and Parts
PKO Bank Polski	PKO	PLPKO0000016	Warsaw Stock Exchange	Poland	Banks
Plus500	PLUS	IL0011284465	London Stock Exchange	United Kingdom	Financial Services
Porsche (preferred shares)	P911	DE000PAG9113	Frankfurt Stock Exchange	Germany	Automobiles and Parts
Porsche SE (preferred shares)	PAH3	DE000PAH0038	Frankfurt Stock Exchange	Germany	Automobiles and Parts
Poste Italiane	PST	IT0003796171	Borsa Italiana	Italy	Financial Services
Powszechny Zakład Ubezpieczeń	PZU	PLPZU0000011	Warsaw Stock Exchange	Poland	Insurance
Primary Health Properties	PHP	GB00BYRJ5J14	London Stock Exchange	United Kingdom	Real Estate
Prosus	PRX	NL0013654783	Euronext	Netherlands	Technology
Prudential plc	PRU	GB0007099541	London Stock Exchange	United Kingdom	Insurance
Prysmian Group	PRY	IT0004176001	Borsa Italiana	Italy	Industrial Goods and Services
PSP Swiss Property	PSPN	CH0018294154	SIX Swiss Exchange	Switzerland	Real Estate
Public Power Corporation	PPC	GRS434003000	Euronext Athens	Greece	Utilities
Publicis	PUB	FR0000130577	Euronext	France	Media
Puig	PUIG	ES0105777017	Bolsa de Madrid	Spain	Consumer Products and Services
Puma	PUM	DE0006969603	Frankfurt Stock Exchange	Germany	Consumer Products and Services
Qiagen	QIA	NL0015002SN0	Frankfurt Stock Exchange	Germany	Healthcare
Qinetiq	QQ.	GB00B0WMWD03	London Stock Exchange	United Kingdom	Industrial Goods and Services
Quilter plc	QLT	GB00BNHSJN34	London Stock Exchange	United Kingdom	Financial Services
Raiffeisen Bank International	RBI	AT0000606306	Wiener Börse	Austria	Banks
Randstad	RAND	NL0000379121	Euronext	Netherlands	Industrial Goods and Services
Rational AG	RAA	DE0007010803	Frankfurt Stock Exchange	Germany	Consumer Products and Services
Reckitt	RKT	GB00BSZBP530	London Stock Exchange	United Kingdom	Personal Care, Drug and Grocery Stores
Recordati	REC	IT0003828271	Borsa Italiana	Italy	Healthcare
Red Eléctrica de España	RED	ES0173093024	Bolsa de Madrid	Spain	Utilities
RELX	REL	GB00B2B0DG97	London Stock Exchange	United Kingdom	Technology
Renault	RNO	FR0000131906	Euronext	France	Automobiles and Parts
Renk	R3NK	DE000RENK730	Frankfurt Stock Exchange	Germany	Industrial Goods and Services
Rentokil Initial	RTO	GB00B082RF11	London Stock Exchange	United Kingdom	Industrial Goods and Services
Reply	REY	IT0005282865	Borsa Italiana	Italy	Technology
Repsol	REP	ES0173516115	Bolsa de Madrid	Spain	Energy
Rexel	RXL	FR0010451203	Euronext	France	Industrial Goods and Services
Rheinmetall	RHM	DE0007030009	Frankfurt Stock Exchange	Germany	Industrial Goods and Services
Richemont	CFR	CH0210483332	SIX Swiss Exchange	Switzerland	Consumer Products and Services
Rightmove	RMV	GB00BGDT3G23	London Stock Exchange	United Kingdom	Real Estate
Ringkjobing Landbobank	RILBA	DK0060854669	Nasdaq Copenhagen	Denmark	Banks
Rio Tinto	RIO	GB0007188757	London Stock Exchange	United Kingdom	Basic Resources
Roche	ROP	CH1499059983	SIX Swiss Exchange	Switzerland	Healthcare
Rockwool International	ROCK B	DK0063855168	Nasdaq Copenhagen	Denmark	Construction and Materials
Rolls-Royce Holdings	RR.	GB00B63H8491	London Stock Exchange	United Kingdom	Industrial Goods and Services
Rosebank Industries	ROSE	JE00BSBJ5M88	London Stock Exchange	United Kingdom	Industrial Goods and Services
Rotork	ROR	GB00BVFNZH21	London Stock Exchange	United Kingdom	Industrial Goods and Services
Royal BAM Group	BAMNB	NL0000337319	Euronext	Netherlands	Construction and Materials
Royal Unibrew	RBREW	DK0060634707	Nasdaq Copenhagen	Denmark	Food, Beverage and Tobacco
RS Group plc	RS1	GB0003096442	London Stock Exchange	United Kingdom	Industrial Goods and Services
Rubis	RUI	FR0013269123	Euronext	France	Retail
RWE	RWE	DE0007037129	Frankfurt Stock Exchange	Germany	Utilities
Ryanair	RYA	IE00BYTBXV33	Euronext	Ireland	Travel and Leisure
Saab AB	SAAB B	SE0021921269	Nasdaq Stockholm	Sweden	Industrial Goods and Services
Sacyr	SCYR	ES0182870214	Bolsa de Madrid	Spain	Construction and Materials
Safran	SAF	FR0000073272	Euronext	France	Industrial Goods and Services
Sagax	SAGA B	SE0005127818	Nasdaq Stockholm	Sweden	Real Estate
Sage Group	SGE	GB00B8C3BL03	London Stock Exchange	United Kingdom	Technology
Sainsbury's	SBRY	GB00B019KW72	London Stock Exchange	United Kingdom	Personal Care, Drug and Grocery Stores
Saint-Gobain	SGO	FR0000125007	Euronext	France	Construction and Materials
Saipem	SPM	IT0005495657	Borsa Italiana	Italy	Energy
SalMar	SALM	NO0010310956	Euronext	Norway	Food, Beverage and Tobacco
Sampo Group	SAMPO	FI4000552500	Nasdaq Helsinki	Finland	Insurance
Sandoz	SDZ	CH1243598427	SIX Swiss Exchange	Switzerland	Healthcare
Sandvik	SAND	SE0000667891	Nasdaq Stockholm	Sweden	Industrial Goods and Services
Sanofi	SAN	FR0000120578	Euronext	France	Healthcare
SAP	SAP	DE0007164600	Frankfurt Stock Exchange	Germany	Technology
Sartorius AG (preferred shares)	SRT3	DE0007165631	Frankfurt Stock Exchange	Germany	Healthcare
Sartorius Stedim Biotech SA	DIM	FR0013154002	Euronext	France	Healthcare
SBM Offshore	SBMO	NL0000360618	Euronext	Netherlands	Energy
SCA	SCA B	SE0000112724	Nasdaq Stockholm	Sweden	Basic Resources
Schindler Group	SCHP	CH0024638196	SIX Swiss Exchange	Switzerland	Industrial Goods and Services
Schneider Electric	SU	FR0000121972	Euronext	France	Industrial Goods and Services
SCOR SE	SCR	FR0010411983	Euronext	France	Insurance
Scout24	G24	DE000A12DM80	Frankfurt Stock Exchange	Germany	Technology
SEB Group	SEB A	SE0000148884	Nasdaq Stockholm	Sweden	Banks
Sectra AB	SECT B	SE0022419784	Nasdaq Stockholm	Sweden	Healthcare
Securitas AB	SECU B	SE0000163594	Nasdaq Stockholm	Sweden	Industrial Goods and Services
Segro	SGRO	GB00B5ZN1N88	London Stock Exchange	United Kingdom	Real Estate
Serco	SRP	GB0007973794	London Stock Exchange	United Kingdom	Industrial Goods and Services
Severn Trent	SVT	GB00B1FH8J72	London Stock Exchange	United Kingdom	Utilities
SFS Group	SFSN	CH0239229302	SIX Swiss Exchange	Switzerland	Industrial Goods and Services
SGS S.A.	SGSN	CH1256740924	SIX Swiss Exchange	Switzerland	Industrial Goods and Services
Shaftesbury Capital	SHC	GB00B62G9D36	London Stock Exchange	United Kingdom	Real Estate
Shell plc	SHEL	GB00BP6MXD84	London Stock Exchange	United Kingdom	Energy
Siegfried Holding AG	SFZN	CH1429326825	SIX Swiss Exchange	Switzerland	Healthcare
Siemens	SIE	DE0007236101	Frankfurt Stock Exchange	Germany	Industrial Goods and Services
Siemens Energy	ENR	DE000ENER6Y0	Frankfurt Stock Exchange	Germany	Energy
Siemens Healthineers	SHL	DE000SHL1006	Frankfurt Stock Exchange	Germany	Healthcare
SIG Group	SIGN	CH0435377954	SIX Swiss Exchange	Switzerland	Industrial Goods and Services
Sika AG	SIKA	CH0418792922	SIX Swiss Exchange	Switzerland	Construction and Materials
Skanska	SKA B	SE0000113250	Nasdaq Stockholm	Sweden	Construction and Materials
SKF	SKF B	SE0000108227	Nasdaq Stockholm	Sweden	Basic Resources
Smith & Nephew	SN.	GB0009223206	London Stock Exchange	United Kingdom	Healthcare
Smiths Group	SMIN	GB00B1WY2338	London Stock Exchange	United Kingdom	Industrial Goods and Services
Snam	SRG	IT0003153415	Borsa Italiana	Italy	Energy
Société Générale	GLE	FR0000130809	Euronext	France	Banks
Sodexo	SW	FR0000121220	Euronext	France	Travel and Leisure
Sofina	SOF	BE0003717312	Euronext	Belgium	Financial Services
Softcat	SCT	GB00BYZDVK82	London Stock Exchange	United Kingdom	Technology
Soitec	SOI	FR0013227113	Euronext	France	Technology
Sonova	SOON	CH0012549785	SIX Swiss Exchange	Switzerland	Healthcare
Sopra Steria	SOP	FR0000050809	Euronext	France	Technology
SpareBank 1 Sør-Norge	SB1NO	NO0010631567	Euronext	Norway	Banks
Sparebanken Vest	SBNOR	NO0006000900	Euronext	Norway	Banks
SPIE	SPIE	FR0012757854	Euronext	France	Construction and Materials
Spirax Group	SPX	GB00BWFGQN14	London Stock Exchange	United Kingdom	Industrial Goods and Services
SSAB	SSAB B	SE0000120669	Nasdaq Stockholm	Sweden	Basic Resources
SSE plc	SSE	GB0007908733	London Stock Exchange	United Kingdom	Utilities
St. James's Place plc	STJ	GB0007669376	London Stock Exchange	United Kingdom	Financial Services
Standard Chartered	STAN	GB0004082847	London Stock Exchange	United Kingdom	Banks
Standard Life plc	SDLF	GB00BGXQNP29	London Stock Exchange	United Kingdom	Insurance
Stellantis	STLAM	NL00150001Q9	Borsa Italiana	Italy	Automobiles and Parts
STMicroelectronics	STMMI	NL0000226223	Borsa Italiana	Italy	Technology
Stora Enso	STERV	FI0009005961	Nasdaq Helsinki	Finland	Industrial Goods and Services
Storebrand	STB	NO0003053605	Euronext	Norway	Insurance
Straumann	STMN	CH1175448666	SIX Swiss Exchange	Switzerland	Healthcare
Subsea 7	SUBC	LU0075646355	Euronext	Norway	Energy
Sulzer	SUN	CH0038388911	SIX Swiss Exchange	Switzerland	Industrial Goods and Services
Sunrise	SUNN	CH1386220409	SIX Swiss Exchange	Switzerland	Telecommunications
Sweco	SWEC B	SE0014960373	Nasdaq Stockholm	Sweden	Construction and Materials
Swedbank	SWED A	SE0000242455	Nasdaq Stockholm	Sweden	Banks
Swedish Orphan Biovitrum	SOBI	SE0000872095	Nasdaq Stockholm	Sweden	Healthcare
Swiss Life	SLHN	CH0014852781	SIX Swiss Exchange	Switzerland	Insurance
Swiss Prime Site	SPSN	CH0008038389	SIX Swiss Exchange	Switzerland	Real Estate
Swiss Re	SREN	CH0126881561	SIX Swiss Exchange	Switzerland	Insurance
Swisscom	SCMN	CH0008742519	SIX Swiss Exchange	Switzerland	Telecommunications
Swissquote	SQN	CH1548235246	SIX Swiss Exchange	Switzerland	Financial Services
Sydbank	ALSYDB	DK0010311471	Nasdaq Copenhagen	Denmark	Banks
Syensqo	SYENS	BE0974464977	Euronext	Belgium	Basic Resources
Symrise	SY1	DE000SYM9999	Frankfurt Stock Exchange	Germany	Chemicals
TAG Tegernsee Immobilien und Beteiligung	TEG	DE0008303504	Frankfurt Stock Exchange	Germany	Real Estate
Talanx	TLX	DE000TLX1005	Frankfurt Stock Exchange	Germany	Insurance
Taylor Wimpey	TW.	GB0008782301	London Stock Exchange	United Kingdom	Consumer Products and Services
TBC Bank	TBCG	GB00BYT18307	London Stock Exchange	United Kingdom	Banks
Technip Energies	TE	NL0014559478	Euronext	France	Energy
Technoprobe	TPRO	IT0005482333	Borsa Italiana	Italy	Technology
Tele2	TEL2 B	SE0005190238	Nasdaq Stockholm	Sweden	Telecommunications
Telefónica	TEF	ES0178430E18	Bolsa de Madrid	Spain	Telecommunications
Telenor	TEL	NO0010063308	Euronext	Norway	Telecommunications
Teleperformance	TEP	FR0000051807	Euronext	France	Industrial Goods and Services
Telia Company	TELIA	SE0000667925	Nasdaq Stockholm	Sweden	Telecommunications
Temenos AG	TEMN	CH0012453913	SIX Swiss Exchange	Switzerland	Technology
Tenaris	TEN	LU2598331598	Borsa Italiana	Italy	Energy
Terna Group	TRN	IT0003242622	Borsa Italiana	Italy	Utilities
Tesco	TSCO	GB00BLGZ9862	London Stock Exchange	United Kingdom	Personal Care, Drug and Grocery Stores
TGS-NOPEC Geophysical Company	TGS	NO0003078800	Euronext	Norway	Energy
Thales Group	HO	FR0000121329	Euronext	France	Industrial Goods and Services
The Magnum Ice Cream Company	MICC	NL0015002MS2	Euronext	Netherlands	Food, Beverage and Tobacco
The Swatch Group	UHR	CH0012255151	SIX Swiss Exchange	Switzerland	Consumer Products and Services
ThyssenKrupp	TKA	DE0007500001	Frankfurt Stock Exchange	Germany	Industrial Goods and Services
Tomra	TOM	NO0012470089	Euronext	Norway	Industrial Goods and Services
TotalEnergies	TTE	FR0000120271	Euronext	France	Energy
TP ICAP	TCAP	JE00BMDZN391	London Stock Exchange	United Kingdom	Financial Services
Trelleborg	TREL B	SE0000114837	Nasdaq Stockholm	Sweden	Industrial Goods and Services
Tritax Big Box REIT	BBOX	GB00BG49KP99	London Stock Exchange	United Kingdom	Real Estate
Tryg	TRYG	DK0060636678	Nasdaq Copenhagen	Denmark	Insurance
TUI Group	TUI1	DE000TUAG505	Frankfurt Stock Exchange	Germany	Travel and Leisure
UBS	UBSG	CH0244767585	SIX Swiss Exchange	Switzerland	Financial Services
UCB	UCB	BE0003739530	Euronext	Belgium	Healthcare
Umicore	UMI	BE0974320526	Euronext	Belgium	Chemicals
Unibail-Rodamco-Westfield	URW	FR0013326246	Euronext	France	Real Estate
Unicaja Banco	UNI	ES0180907000	Bolsa de Madrid	Spain	Banks
UniCredit	UCG	IT0005239360	Borsa Italiana	Italy	Banks
Unilever	ULVR	GB00BVZK7T90	London Stock Exchange	United Kingdom	Personal Care, Drug and Grocery Stores
Unipol	UNI	IT0004810054	Borsa Italiana	Italy	Insurance
Unite Students	UTG	GB0006928617	London Stock Exchange	United Kingdom	Real Estate
United Utilities	UU.	GB00B39J2M42	London Stock Exchange	United Kingdom	Utilities
Universal Music Group	UMG	NL0015000IY2	Euronext	Netherlands	Media
UPM	UPM	FI0009005987	Nasdaq Helsinki	Finland	Basic Resources
Valeo	FR	FR0013176526	Euronext	France	Automobiles and Parts
Valiant Bank	VATN	CH0014786500	SIX Swiss Exchange	Switzerland	Banks
Vallourec	VK	FR0013506730	Euronext	France	Energy
Valmet	VALMT	FI4000074984	Nasdaq Helsinki	Finland	Industrial Goods and Services
Vår Energi	VAR	NO0011202772	Euronext	Norway	Energy
VAT Group	VACN	CH0311864901	SIX Swiss Exchange	Switzerland	Industrial Goods and Services
Vend Marketplaces ASA	VEND	NO0010736879	Euronext	Norway	Technology
Veolia	VIE	FR0000124141	Euronext	France	Utilities
Verbund	VER	AT0000746409	Wiener Börse	Austria	Utilities
Verisure	VSURE	GB00BVMN1558	Nasdaq Stockholm	Sweden	Industrial Goods and Services
Vestas	VWS	DK0061539921	Nasdaq Copenhagen	Denmark	Energy
Vinci SA	DG	FR0000125486	Euronext	France	Construction and Materials
Vodafone	VOD	GB00BH4HKS39	London Stock Exchange	United Kingdom	Telecommunications
Voestalpine	VOE	AT0000937503	Wiener Börse	Austria	Basic Resources
Volkswagen Group (preferred shares)	VOW3	DE0007664039	Frankfurt Stock Exchange	Germany	Automobiles and Parts
Volvo	VOLV B	SE0000115446	Nasdaq Stockholm	Sweden	Industrial Goods and Services
Vonovia	VNA	DE000A1ML7J1	Frankfurt Stock Exchange	Germany	Real Estate
Vontobel	VONN	CH0012335540	SIX Swiss Exchange	Switzerland	Financial Services
Vopak	VPK	NL0009432491	Euronext	Netherlands	Energy
VZ Holding	VZN	CH0528751586	SIX Swiss Exchange	Switzerland	Financial Services
Warehouses De Pauw	WDP	BE0974349814	Euronext	Belgium	Real Estate
Wärtsilä	WRT1V	FI0009003727	Nasdaq Helsinki	Finland	Industrial Goods and Services
Weir plc	WEIR	GB0009465807	London Stock Exchange	United Kingdom	Industrial Goods and Services
Whitbread	WTB	GB00B1KJJ408	London Stock Exchange	United Kingdom	Travel and Leisure
Wise	WISE	JE00BQKY0816	London Stock Exchange	United Kingdom	Industrial Goods and Services
Wolters Kluwer	WKL	NL0000395903	Euronext	Netherlands	Industrial Goods and Services
WPP plc	WPP	JE00B8KF9B49	London Stock Exchange	United Kingdom	Media
XTB S.A.	XTB	PLXTRDM00011	Warsaw Stock Exchange	Poland	Financial Services
Yara International	YAR	NO0010208051	Euronext	Norway	Chemicals
Żabka	ZAB	LU2910446546	Warsaw Stock Exchange	Poland	Personal Care, Drug and Grocery Stores
Zalando	ZAL	DE000ZAL1111	Frankfurt Stock Exchange	Germany	Retail
Zealand Pharma	ZEAL	DK0060257814	Nasdaq Copenhagen	Denmark	Healthcare
Zegona Communications	ZEG	GB00BVGBY890	London Stock Exchange	United Kingdom	Telecommunications
Zurich Insurance Group	ZURN	CH0011075394	SIX Swiss Exchange	Switzerland	Insurance

== Recent changes ==
The following changes took effect with the quarterly review of 21 September 2026.

Added	Removed
National Bank of Greece (GR)	Kongsberg Maritime (NO)
Endeavour Mining (GB)	Fraport (DE)
Eurobank (GR)	JD Sports (GB)
Piraeus Bank (GR)	Wienerberger (AT)
Alpha Bank (GR)	Bakkafrost (NO)
Public Power (GR)	Tauron (PL)
Metlen Energy & Metals (GR)	Bucher Industries (CH)
GEK Terna (GR)	Aumovio (DE)
Motor Oil (Hellas) (GR)	Viscofan (ES)
Rosebank Industries (GB)	Thule Group (SE)
XTB (PL)	Kemira (FI)
Softcat (GB)	Wihlborgs Fastigheter (SE)
easyJet (GB)	Signify (NL)
Jumbo (GR)	SES (FR)

== Components by country and supersector ==
Number of companies in the index as of 30 October 2026.

Country	Companies
United Kingdom	128
France	69
Germany	68
Switzerland	60
Sweden	51
Italy	39
Netherlands	31
Spain	27
Denmark	23
Norway	22
Finland	18
Poland	18
Belgium	17
Greece	10
Austria	8
Ireland	6
Portugal	5
Total	600

Supersector	Companies
Industrial Goods and Services	105
Banks	61
Healthcare	46
Financial Services	38
Technology	35
Construction and Materials	31
Utilities	29
Insurance	28
Consumer Products and Services	27
Energy	27
Real Estate	27
Food, Beverage and Tobacco	26
Basic Resources	22
Telecommunications	20
Chemicals	17
Personal Care, Drug and Grocery Stores	15
Automobiles and Parts	13
Travel and Leisure	13
Retail	12
Media	8
Total	600

== See also ==
- STOXX Europe 50, a similar index, blue-chip version
- S&P Europe 350
