= Euronext 100 =

Stock market index

Euronext 100 Index
- Foundation: December 31, 1999; 26 years ago
- Operator: Euronext
- Exchanges: Euronext
- Trading symbol: N100
- Constituents: 100
- Type: Large cap
- Weighting method: Full market capitalization-weighted index
- Website: live.euronext.com/en/product/indices/FR0003502079-XPAR

The Euronext 100 Index is a stock market index of blue chip stocks on the pan-European exchange, Euronext. It comprises the 100 largest and most liquid stocks traded on Euronext. Each stock must trade more than 20 percent of its issued shares over the course of the rolling one year analysis period.

The index is reviewed quarterly through a size and liquidity analysis of the investment universe. As of December 21, 2002, the stocks in the Euronext100 Index represent 80% (euro 1,177 billion) of the total market capitalization of Euronext’s investment universe (euro 1,477 billion). Each stock in the index is given a sector classification.

== Components by country ==
Members of Euronext 100

France : 38

Italy : 22

Netherlands : 21

Norway: 6

Ireland: 5

Belgium : 5

Portugal : 3

== Components ==
Ticker	Name	Main listing	Corporate form
AC.PA	Accor	(France)	Paris
ADP.PA	Aéroports de Paris	(France)	Paris
ADYEN.AS	Adyen	(Netherlands)	Amsterdam
AGN.AS	Aegon	(Netherlands)	Amsterdam
A5G.IR	AIB	(Republic of Ireland)	Dublin
AI.PA	Air Liquide	(France)	Paris
AIR.PA	Airbus	(France)	Paris
AKRBP.OL	Aker	(Norway)	Oslo
AKZA.AS	Akzo Nobel	(Netherlands)	Amsterdam
AD.AS	Ahold Delhaize	(Netherlands)	Amsterdam
MT.AS	ArcelorMittal	(Netherlands) (France)	Amsterdam, Paris
ARGX.BR	Argenx	(Belgium)	Brussels
ASM.AS	ASM International	(Netherlands)	Amsterdam
ASML.AS	ASML	(Netherlands)	Amsterdam
ASRNL.AS	ASR Nederland	(Netherlands)	Amsterdam
CS.PA	Axa	(France)	Paris
BIRG.IR	Bank of Ireland	(Republic of Ireland)	Dublin
BESI.AS	BE Semiconductor Industries	(Netherlands)	Amsterdam
BIM.PA	BioMérieux	(France)	Paris
BNP.PA	BNP Paribas	(France)	Paris
EN.PA	Bouygues	(France)	Paris
BVI.PA	Bureau Veritas	(France)	Paris
CPR.MI	Cattolica Assicurazioni	(Italy)	Milan
CAP.PA	Capgemini	(France)	Paris
CA.PA	Carrefour	(France)	Paris
ACA.PA	Crédit Agricole	(France)	Paris
DIE.BR	Deutsche Börse	(Germany)	Frankfurt
BN.PA	Danone	(France)	Paris
DSY.PA	Dassault Systèmes	(France)	Paris
DNB.OL	DNB	(Norway)	Oslo
DSFIR.AS	DSM	(Netherlands)	Amsterdam
EDEN.PA	Edenred	(France)	Paris
EDP.LS	EDP	(Portugal)	Lisbon
EDPR.LS	EDP Renováveis	(Portugal)	Lisbon
FGR.PA	Eiffage	(France)	Paris
ENEL.MI	Enel	(Italy)	Milan
ENGI.PA	Engie	(France)	Paris
ENI.MI	Eni	(Italy)	Milan
EQNR.OL	Equinor	(Norway)	Oslo
EL.PA	Essilor	(France)	Paris
ERF.PA	Eramet	(France)	Paris
ENX.PA	Euronext	(France)	Paris
RACE.MI	Ferrari	(Italy)	Milan
FBK.MI	FinecoBank	(Italy)	Milan
GALP.LS	Galp Energia	(Portugal)	Lisbon
GBLB.BR	Groupe Bruxelles Lambert	(Belgium)	Brussels
G.MI	Generali	(Italy)	Milan
HAVAS.AS	Havas	(France)	Paris
HEIA.AS	Heineken	(Netherlands)	Amsterdam
INGA.AS	ING	(Netherlands)	Amsterdam
ISP.MI	Intesa Sanpaolo	(Italy)	Milan
INW.MI	Infrastrutture Wireless Italiane	(Italy)	Milan
IPN.PA	Ipsen	(France)	Paris
JMT.LS	Jerónimo Martins	(Portugal)	Lisbon
KBC.BR	KBC Bank	(Belgium)	Brussels
KER.PA	Kering	(France)	Paris
KRZ.IR	Kerry Group	(Republic of Ireland)	Dublin
KRX.IR	Kingspan Group	(Republic of Ireland)	Dublin
PHIA.AS	Koninklijke Philips N.V.	(Netherlands)	Amsterdam
KOG.OL	Kongsberg	(Norway)	Oslo
AD.AS	Koninklijke Ahold Delhaize N.V.	(Netherlands)	Amsterdam
KPN.AS	KPN	(Netherlands)	Amsterdam
LR.PA	Legrand	(France)	Paris
LDO.MI	Leonardo	(Italy)	Milan
MB.MI	Mediobanca	(Italy)	Milan
ML.PA	Michelin	(France)	Paris
MONC.MI	Moncler	(Italy)	Milan
MOWI.OL	Mowi	(Norway)	Oslo
NN.AS	Nationale-Nederlanden	(Netherlands)	Amsterdam
NHY.OL	Norsk Hydro ASA	(Norway)	Oslo
ORA.PA	Orange	(France)	Paris
RI.PA	Pernod Ricard	(France)	Paris
PST.MI	Poste italiane	(Italy)	Milan
PRX.AS	Prosus	(Netherlands)	Amsterdam
PRY.MI	Prysmian	(Italy)	Milan
PUB.PA	Publicis	(France)	Paris
REC.MI	Recordati	(Italy)	Milan
RNO.PA	Renault	(France)	Paris
RYA.IR	Ryanair	(Republic of Ireland)	Dublin
SAF.PA	Safran	(France)	Paris
SGO.PA	Saint-Gobain	(France)	Paris
SAN.PA	Sanofi	(France)	Paris
DIM.PA	Sartorius Stedim Biotech	(France)	Paris
SU.PA	Schneider Electric	(France)	Paris
SHEEL.AS	Shell	(Netherlands)	Amsterdam
SRG.MI	Snam	(Italy)	Milan
GLE.PA	Société Générale	(France)	Paris
SW.PA	Sodexo	(France)	Paris
STLAM.MI	Stellantis	(Italy)	Milan
STMPA.PA	STMicroelectronics	(France)	Paris
TEL.OL	Telenor	(Norway)	Oslo
TEN.MI	Tenaris	(Italy)	Milan
TRN.MI	Terna	(Italy)	Milan
HO.PA	Thales	(France)	Paris
TTE.PA	TotalEnergies	(France)	Paris
UCB.BR	UCB	(Belgium)	Brussels
URW.PA	Unibail-Rodamco-Westfield	(France)	Paris
UCG.MI	Unicredit	(Italy)	Milan
VIE.PA	Veolia Environnement	(France)	Paris
DG.PA	Vinci	(France)	Paris
VIV.PA	Vivendi	(France)	Paris
WKL.AS	Wolters Kluwer	(Netherlands)	Amsterdam

== See also ==
- STOXX Europe 50
- S&P Europe 350
