= EURO STOXX 50 =

Blue chip stock market index

EURO STOXX 50 Index
- Foundation: 26 February 1998
- Operator: STOXX
- Constituents: 50
- Type: Mega cap
- Market cap: €4.011 trillion (Aug 2023)
- Weighting method: Free-float market capitalization
- Related indices: STOXX Europe 50
- Website: stoxx.com/index/sx5e/

The EURO STOXX 50 is a stock index of Eurozone stocks designed by STOXX, an index provider that has been part of the ISS STOXX group, majority-owned by the Deutsche Börse Group, since November 2023. The index is composed of 50 stocks from countries of the Eurozone.

EURO STOXX 50 represents Eurozone blue-chip companies considered as leaders in their respective sectors. It is made up of fifty of the largest and most liquid stocks. The index futures and options on the EURO STOXX 50, traded on Eurex, are among the most liquid products in Europe and the world.

Contract Specifications
Euro Stoxx 50 (DSX)	
Exchange:	EUREX
Sector:	Index
Tick Size:	1
Tick Value:	10 EUR
BPV:	10
Denomination:	EUR
Decimal Place:	1

The EURO STOXX 50 was introduced on 26 February 1998.

The EURO STOXX 50 Index represents some of the largest companies in the Eurozone in terms of free-float market capitalization. The index captures about 60% of the free-float market capitalization of the EURO STOXX Total Market Index (TMI), which in turn covers about 95% of the free-float market capitalization of the represented countries.

The EURO STOXX 50 is one of the most liquid indices for the Eurozone.

== Historical performance ==
View chart definition.
Performance of the Euro Stoxx 50 stock market index since 1998
(end-of-year points)

EURO STOXX 50 was quoted only starting 1998 but its prices were calculated retroactively back to the year 1986. The base value is 1000 points, referenced on 31 December 1991. The following table shows the end-of-year values of the EURO STOXX 50 index since 1986. Index values before 1999 are based on the euro's predecessor, the European Currency Unit (ECU).

Year	Year end value	Change, in points	Change, in %
1986	900.82		
1987	648.13	−252.69	−28.05
1988	861.36	213.23	32.90
1989	1098.49	237.13	27.53
1990	858.72	−239.77	−21.83
1991	1000.00	141.28	16.45
1992	1033.51	33.51	3.35
1993	1433.34	399.83	38.69
1994	1320.59	−112.75	−7.87
1995	1506.82	186.23	14.10
1996	1850.32	343.50	22.80
1997	2531.99	681.67	36.84
1998	3342.32	810.33	32.00
1999	4904.46	1562.14	46.74
2000	4772.39	−132.07	−2.69
2001	3806.13	−966.26	−20.25
2002	2386.41	−1419.72	−37.30
2003	2760.66	374.25	15.68
2004	2951.24	190.58	6.90
2005	3578.93	627.69	21.27
2006	4119.94	541.01	15.12
2007	4399.72	279.78	6.79
2008	2451.48	−1948.24	−44.28
2009	2966.24	514.76	21.00
2010	2792.82	−173.42	−5.85
2011	2316.55	−476.27	−17.05
2012	2635.93	319.38	13.79
2013	3109.00	473.07	17.95
2014	3146.43	37.43	1.20
2015	3267.52	121.09	3.85
2016	3290.52	23.00	0.7
2017	3503.96	213.44	6.47
2018	3001.42	−502.54	−14.34
2019	3745.16	743.73	24.78
2020	3552.64	−192.52	−5.14
2021	4298.41	745.77	20.99
2022	3793.62	−504.79	−11.74
2023	4521.65	728.03	19.19
2024	4895.98	374.33	8.28
2025	5791.41	895.43	18.29

== Calculation ==
The calculation of the indices employ the Laspeyres formula, which measures price changes against a fixed base quantity weight:

$$Index_t=\frac{\displaystyle \sum_{i=1}^n (p_{it}\cdot s_{it}\cdot ff_{it}\cdot cf_{it}\cdot x_{it})}{D_{t}}=\frac{M_{t}}{D_{t}}$$

where: vcc:FdDF

t = Time the index is computed
n = Number of companies in the index
p_{it} = Price of company (i) at time (t)
s_{it} = Number of shares of company (i) at time (t)
ff_{it} = Free-float factor of company (i) at time (t)
cf_{it} = Weighting cap factor of company (i) at time (t)
x_{it} = Exchange rate from local currency into index currency for company (i) at time (t)
M_{t} = Free-float market capitalization of the index at time (t)
D_{t} = Divisor of the index at time (t)

Changes in weights due to corporate actions are distributed proportionally across all index components. The index divisors, which is adjusted to maintain the continuity of the values of the index across changes due to corporate actions, are calculated as follows:

$$D_{t+1}=D_t \cdot \frac{\displaystyle \sum_{i=1}^n (p_{it}\cdot s_{it}\cdot ff_{it}\cdot cf_{it}\cdot x_{it})\pm \Delta MC_{t+1}}{\displaystyle \sum_{i=1}^n (p_{it}\cdot s_{it}\cdot ff_{it}\cdot cf_{it}\cdot x_{it})}$$

where ΔMC_{t+1} = The difference between the closing market capitalization of the index and the adjusted closing market capitalization of the index: for companies with corporate actions effective at time (t+1), the free-float market capitalization is calculated with adjusted closing prices, the new number of shares at time (t+1) and the free-float factor at time (t+1) minus the free-float market capitalization calculated with closing prices, number of shares at time (t) and free-float factor at time (t).

Buffers are used to achieve the fixed number of components and to maintain stability of the indices by reducing index composition changes. Selection methodology ensures a stable and up-to-date index composition. Fast-entry and fast-exit rules ensure the index accurately represents the performance of only the biggest and most liquid stocks.

== Composition ==
The composition of EURO STOXX 50 is reviewed annually in September. The index is available in several currency (AUD, CAD, CHF, EUR, GBP, JPY, USD) and return (Price, Net Return, Gross Return) variant combinations. Calculation takes place every 15 seconds between 09:00 CET and 18:00 CET for the EUR and USD variants of any return type, while the CAD, GBP and JPY variants are available as end-of-day calculation only (18:00 CET). The EURO STOXX 50 Index is derived from the 20 EURO STOXX Supersector indices (19 before the September 2020 review). As of 21 September 2026, the countries with the most companies represented are France and Germany, with 16 companies each.

As of 21 September 2026, following the annual review in which Engie and Nokia replaced Wolters Kluwer and Volkswagen preference shares, Euro Stoxx 50 consists of the following companies:

Ticker	Main listing	Name	Corporate form	Registered office	Sector	Founded
ADS.DE	(Germany) FWB: ADS	Adidas	(Germany) Aktiengesellschaft	Germany	Consumer Discretionary	1924
ADYEN.AS	(Netherlands) Euronext Amsterdam: ADYEN	Adyen	(Netherlands) Naamloze vennootschap	Netherlands	Financials	2006
AD.AS	(Netherlands) Euronext Amsterdam: AD	Ahold Delhaize	(Netherlands) Naamloze vennootschap	Netherlands	Consumer Staples	2016 (1867)
AI.PA	(France) Euronext Paris: AI	Air Liquide	(France) Société Anonyme	France	Materials	1902
AIR.PA	(France) Euronext Paris: AIR	Airbus	(European Union) Societas Europaea	France	Industrials	1970
ALV.DE	(Germany) FWB: ALV	Allianz	(European Union) Societas Europaea	Germany	Financials	1890
ABI.BR	(Belgium) Euronext Brussels: ABI	Anheuser-Busch InBev	(Belgium) Société Anonyme	Belgium	Consumer Staples	2008 (1366/1888/1852/1895)
ARGX.BR	(Belgium) Euronext Brussels: ARGX	Argenx	(Netherlands) Naamloze vennootschap	Netherlands	Health Care	2008
ASML.AS	(Netherlands) Euronext Amsterdam: ASML	ASML Holding	(Netherlands) Naamloze vennootschap	Netherlands	Information Technology	1984
CS.PA	(France) Euronext Paris: CS	Axa	(France) Société Anonyme	France	Financials	1816
BAS.DE	(Germany) FWB: BAS	BASF	(European Union) Societas Europaea	Germany	Materials	1865
BAYN.DE	(Germany) FWB: BAYN	Bayer	(Germany) Aktiengesellschaft	Germany	Health Care	1863
BBVA.MC	(Spain) BMAD: BBVA	BBVA	(Spain) Sociedad Anónima	Spain	Financials	1857
SAN.MC	(Spain) BMAD: SAN	Banco Santander	(Spain) Sociedad Anónima	Spain	Financials	1857
BMW.DE	(Germany) FWB: BMW	BMW	(Germany) Aktiengesellschaft	Germany	Consumer Discretionary	1916
BNP.PA	(France) Euronext Paris: BNP	BNP Paribas	(France) Société Anonyme	France	Financials	2002 (1848/1872)
BN.PA	(France) Euronext Paris: BN	Danone	(France) Société Anonyme	France	Consumer Staples	1919
DBK.DE	(Germany) FWB: DBK	Deutsche Bank	(Germany) Aktiengesellschaft	Germany	Financials	1870
DB1.DE	(Germany) FWB: DB1	Deutsche Börse	(Germany) Aktiengesellschaft	Germany	Financials	1992
DHL.DE	(Germany) FWB: DHL	Deutsche Post	(Germany) Aktiengesellschaft	Germany	Industrials	1995
DTE.DE	(Germany) FWB: DTE	Deutsche Telekom	(Germany) Aktiengesellschaft	Germany	Communication	1995
ENEL.MI	(Italy) BIT: ENEL	Enel	(Italy) Società per azioni	Italy	Utilities	1962
ENGI.PA	(France) Euronext Paris: ENGI	Engie	(France) Société Anonyme	France	Utilities	2008
ENI.MI	(Italy) BIT: ENI	Eni	(Italy) Società per azioni	Italy	Energy	1953
EL.PA	(France) Euronext Paris: EL	EssilorLuxottica	(France) Société anonyme	France	Health Care	1849
RACE.MI	(Italy) BIT: RACE	Ferrari	(Netherlands) Naamloze vennootschap	Netherlands	Consumer Discretionary	1939
RMS.PA	(France) Euronext Paris: RMS	Hermès	(France) Société Anonyme	France	Consumer Discretionary	1837
IBE.MC	(Spain) BMAD: IBE	Iberdrola	(Spain) Sociedad Anónima	Spain	Utilities	1992 (1907/1944)
ITX.MC	(Spain) BMAD: ITX	Inditex	(Spain) Sociedad Anónima	Spain	Consumer Discretionary	1985
IFX.DE	(Germany) FWB: IFX	Infineon Technologies	(Germany) Aktiengesellschaft	Germany	Information Technology	1999
INGA.AS	(Netherlands) Euronext Amsterdam: INGA	ING Group	(Netherlands) Naamloze vennootschap	Netherlands	Financials	1991
ISP.MI	(Italy) BIT: ISP	Intesa Sanpaolo	(Italy) Società per azioni	Italy	Financials	2007 (1563)
OR.PA	(France) Euronext Paris: OR	L'Oréal	(France) Société Anonyme	France	Consumer Staples	1909
MC.PA	(France) Euronext Paris: MC	LVMH Moët Hennessy Louis Vuitton	(European Union) Societas Europaea	France	Consumer Discretionary	1987 (1743 / 1765 / 1854)
MBG.DE	(Germany) FWB: MBG	Mercedes-Benz Group	(Germany) Aktiengesellschaft	Germany	Consumer Discretionary	2007 (1926)
MUV2.DE	(Germany) FWB: MUV2	Munich Re	(Germany) Aktiengesellschaft	Germany	Financials	1880
NOKIA.HE	(Finland) Nasdaq Helsinki: NOKIA	Nokia	(Finland) Julkinen osakeyhtiö	Finland	Information Technology	1865
NDA-FI.HE	(Finland) Nasdaq Helsinki: NDA FI	Nordea	(Finland) Aktiebolag	Finland	Financials	1820
PRX.AS	(Netherlands) Euronext Amsterdam: PRX	Prosus	(Netherlands) Naamloze vennootschap	Netherlands	Consumer Discretionary	2019
RHM.DE	(Germany) FWB: RHM	Rheinmetall	(Germany) Aktiengesellschaft	Germany	Industrials	1889
SAF.PA	(France) Euronext Paris: SAF	Safran	(France) Société Anonyme	France	Industrials	2005
SGO.PA	(France) Euronext Paris: SGO	Saint-Gobain	(France) Société Anonyme	France	Industrials	1665
SAN.PA	(France) Euronext Paris: SAN	Sanofi	(France) Société Anonyme	France	Health Care	2004 (1834/1899/1973)
SAP.DE	(Germany) FWB: SAP	SAP	(European Union) Societas Europaea	Germany	Information Technology	1972
SU.PA	(France) Euronext Paris: SU	Schneider Electric	(European Union) Societas Europaea	France	Industrials	1836
SIE.DE	(Germany) FWB: SIE	Siemens	(Germany) Aktiengesellschaft	Germany	Industrials	1847
ENR.DE	(Germany) FWB: ENR	Siemens Energy	(Germany) Aktiengesellschaft	Germany	Industrials	2020
TTE.PA	(France) Euronext Paris: TTE	TotalEnergies	(European Union) Societas Europaea	France	Energy	1924
DG.PA	(France) Euronext Paris: DG	Vinci SA	(France) Société Anonyme	France	Industrials	1899
UCG.MI	(Italy) BIT: UCG	UniCredit	(Italy) Società per azioni	Italy	Financials	1998

== Stocks per country ==
The following table shows the number of stocks (companies) per country, as assigned by STOXX, as of 21 September 2026:

Rank	Country	Stocks
1	France	16
1	Germany	16
3	Italy	5
3	Netherlands	5
5	Spain	4
6	Belgium	2
6	Finland	2
	Total	50

== Use in the financial industry ==
The EURO STOXX 50 serves as the basis for single sub-indices such as the EURO STOXX 50 ex Financials, which excludes all companies assigned to the ICB code 30 (code 8000 before the September 2020 review). EURO STOXX 50 is used for as underlying index for other financial products or for performance benchmarking purposes. Additionally, the index serves as an underlying for many strategy indices, such as the EURO STOXX 50 Risk Control Indices. The index is used as an underlying for ETFs and derivative financial instruments such as futures and options.

== Planned methodology changes ==
On 6 October 2026, following a market consultation, STOXX announced a phased overhaul of the index methodology:

- From the September 2027 review, fast exits occurring in March, June, September and December will be implemented at the close of the third Friday of the month, aligned with the regular review and rebalancing schedule.
- From the September 2028 review, the index will be reviewed semiannually, in March and September, with the first March review in 2029.
- From the September 2029 review, the Supersector constraint used in stock selection since the index's launch in 1998 will be removed: all eligible stocks will be ranked by free-float market capitalization, while the existing 40–60 selection buffer is retained.

== See also ==
- STOXX Europe 50 (a similar index not limited to the Eurozone)
- STOXX Europe 600
- S&P Europe 350 (a similar but broader index for European stocks maintained by S&P)
