= S&P Europe 350 Dividend Aristocrats =

European stock index since 2005

The S&P Europe 350 Dividend Aristocrats is the European equivalent of the S&P 500 Dividend Aristocrats. It is a stock index of European constituents that have followed a policy of consistently increasing dividends every year for at least 10 consecutive years. The index was launched on May 2, 2005. It is a subset of the S&P Europe 350. ETFs exist for the set of constituents. The constituents of the index are determined by rules set forth by Standard & Poor's.

== Companies that meet the criteria for being a constituent of the S&P Europe 350 Dividend Aristocrats ==
Ticker	Name	Registered office	Industry
AHT.L	Ashtead Group	United Kingdom	Equipment rental
BA.L	BAE Systems	United Kingdom	Aerospace, Arms industry, Information security
BNR.DE	Brenntag	Germany	-
BATS.L	British American Tobacco	United Kingdom	Tobacco industry
COLO-B.CO	Coloplast	Denmark	Healthcare
DGE.L	Diageo	United Kingdom	Beverages
DNB.OL	DNB ASA	Norway	Financial services
DSV.CO	DSV	Denmark	Transport
EXPN.L	Experian	United Kingdom	Corporate services
FME.DE	Fresenius Medical Care	Germany	Healthcare
FRE.DE	Fresenius	Germany	Healthcare
GIVN.SW	Givaudan	Switzerland	Speciality chemicals
HEXA-B.ST	Hexagon AB	Sweden	Software
ITRK.L	Intertek	United Kingdom	Product testing
KRZ.IR	Kerry Group	Ireland	Food company
LISP.SW	Chocoladefabriken Lindt & Sprüngli	Switzerland	Confectionery
LOGN.SW	Logitech	Switzerland	-
NESN.SW	Nestlé	Switzerland	Food processing
NOVN.SW	Novartis	Switzerland	Pharmaceuticals
NOVO-B.CO	Novo Nordisk	Denmark	Pharmaceuticals
NSIS-B.CO	Novonesis	Denmark	Biotechnology
PGHN.SW	Partners Group	Switzerland	Private equity
ROG.SW	Roche	Switzerland	Pharmaceuticals
RED.MC	Red Eléctrica	Spain	Electric utilities
SAN.PA	Sanofi	France	Pharmaceuticals
SGE.L	Sage Group	United Kingdom	Software
SREN.SW	Swiss Re	Switzerland	Financial services
UCB.BR	UCB	Belgium	Pharmaceuticals
ULVR.L	Unilever	United Kingdom	Consumer goods
WKL.AS	Wolters Kluwer	Netherlands	Publishing

Country makeup
1. United Kingdom (26.7%)
2. Switzerland (26.7%)
3. Denmark (13.3%)
4. Germany (10.0%)
5. Belgium (3.30%)
6. France (3.30%)
7. Ireland (3.30%)
8. Netherlands (3.30%)
9. Norway (3.30%)
10. Spain (3.30%)
11. Sweden (3.30%)

== See also ==
- S&P 500 Dividend Aristocrats
- S&P Europe 350
- Euro Stoxx 50
