= SFS =

SFS may refer to:

== Places ==
- Subic Bay International Airport (IATA airport code: SFS), Subic Bay Freeport Zone, Morong, Bataan, Olongapo, Central Luzon, Luzon, Philippines

== Computers ==
- SAN file system
- Self-certifying File System, a decentralized network file system
- Smart File System, a journaling filesystem used on Amiga computers
- SquashFS, a compressed file system for Linux operating systems
- Simple Features, an OpenGIS standard for storage of geographical data
- The partition type of Windows Dynamic disks, see Logical Disk Manager#Basic and dynamic disks and volumes

== Education ==
- Society for Financial Studies, nonprofit academic society
- Saint Francis School Deoghar, English-medium convent school in Jharkhand, India
- Seoul Foreign School, English language school in Seoul, South Korea
- Sidwell Friends School, private Quaker school in Washington DC
- The School for Field Studies, the USA's oldest and largest undergraduate environmental study abroad program
- Edmund A. Walsh School of Foreign Service, a school of international relations within Georgetown University
- Swedish National Union of Students (Swedish: Sveriges Förenade Studentkårer)

== Sports ==
- Sioux Falls Skyforce, a basketball team from Sioux Falls, South Dakota
- Sydney Football Stadium (1988), demolished Australian stadium
- Sydney Football Stadium (2022), Australian stadium

== Companies and organizations ==
- San Francisco Symphony
- SFS Group, Swiss fastener manufacturer
- Finnish Standards Association

== Other ==
- Swedish Code of Statutes (Svensk författningssamling)
- Effluent sewer or solids-free sewer

== See also ==
- SF (disambiguation) for the singular of SFs
