= STOXX =

Swiss globally integrated index provider

STOXX Ltd.
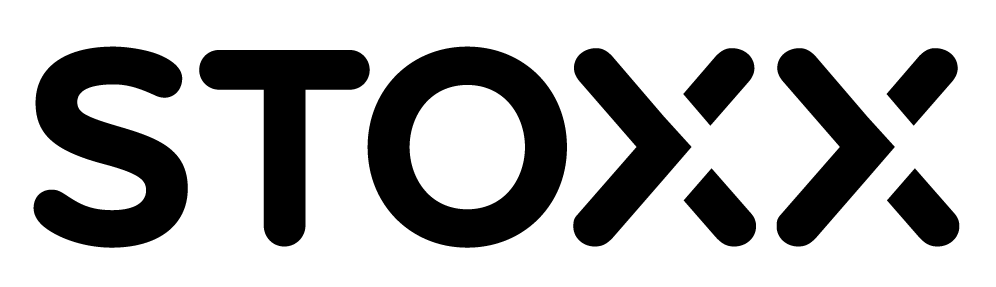
- Type: Subsidiary
- Industry: Financial services
- Founded: 1998
- Headquarters: Zug, Switzerland
- Key people: Axel Lomholt (general manager)
- Services: Stock market indices
- Parent: Deutsche Börse Group
- Website: stoxx.com

STOXX Ltd. is a global index provider which covers global markets across various asset classes –developing, maintaining, distributing and marketing a comprehensive global family of strictly rules-based and transparent indices. STOXX, headquartered in Zug (Switzerland) with key locations in New York, Eschborn (Germany) and London, is part of ISS STOXX, which is part of the Deutsche Börse Group. STOXX calculates more than 17,000 indices and in addition acts as the administrator for the DAX indices.

STOXX indices are licensed to financial institutions and other users for use with exchange-traded funds (ETFs), mutual funds, futures, options, structured products, and other purposes.

== History ==
STOXX Limited began operations in 1998, when the EURO STOXX 50 blue-chip benchmark and other indices were launched. In 2000 STOXX was the first index provider to implement free float market capitalization in all its indices. In December 2009 Deutsche Börse and SIX Group became sole shareholders of STOXX after Dow Jones exited the joint venture. Shortly after STOXX renamed all indices by removing the "DJ/Dow Jones" prefix. In July 2010 STOXX became the marketing agent for Deutsche Börse and SIX Swiss Exchange indices.

In 2015 Deutsche Börse purchased the remaining 49.9% shares of STOXX from SIX Group along with the remaining shares of the joint venture Indexium AG at a cost of 650m Swiss Francs.

In 2019, STOXX was combined with Axioma Inc. to form Qontigo.

In 2023, STOXX became part of ISS STOXX which is part of the Investment Management Solutions business area of Deutsche Börse Group.

== Indices ==
The STOXX Index family represents a wide range of indices covering different market segments and different investment strategies. On a regional level the indices initially covered Europe, the Eurozone and Eastern Europe.

In 2011 STOXX expanded its index range by adding a consistent global index family for global regions and countries. The STOXX 1800 is a global index, with 600 components from the Asia Pacific region.

STOXX calculates and distributes the well-known EURO STOXX 50, STOXX Europe 50, and STOXX Europe 600 indices, which are used as the underlying indices for numerous derivative financial instruments such as options, futures and index funds.

Since 2013 with its GC Pooling index family STOXX offers a completely rules based interbank rate benchmark based on secured euro lending transactions. The European Central Bank (ECB) uses the STOXX GC Pooling Indices as new euro secured benchmarks.

In 2016, STOXX introduced its first fixed income index, the EURO STOXX 50 Corporate Bond Index. The index tracks the corporate debt of the EURO STOXX 50 companies.

In 2018 STOXX launched its ESG-screened versions of more than 40 benchmarks that meet the standard responsible-investing criteria of leading asset owners. The suite offers ESG-X versions of global, regional and emerging markets benchmarks, including ESG-X versions of the EURO STOXX 50 and the STOXX Europe 600. The ESG-X indices incorporate standard norm- and product-based exclusions that aim to limit market and reputational risks while keeping a low tracking error and a similar risk-return profile to the respective benchmark.

In 2019 STOXX continued its focus on responsible-investing by launching a new family of ESG-X indices, EURO STOXX 50 ESG, and extended its thematic suite to include EURO iSTOXX Ocean Care 40 and STOXX Global Next Generation Telecoms.

In 2020, STOXX introduced DAX 50 ESG and EU-Compliant Climate Benchmark Indices, which are designed to facilitate the shift towards a low-carbon economy and align investments with the Paris Climate Agreement.

In 2021, the DAX index was expanded from 30 to 40 components.

In 2023, the ISS STOXX Biodiversity Indices were launched.

== ESG & Sustainability ==
STOXX launched index solutions to allow investors to meet their sustainability commitments and goals:

- "Exclude" strategies - a category for seeking to raise the ESG profile of portfolios but maintain low tracking errors
- "Enhance" strategies - a category for investors who wish to maximize their portfolios' ESG profiles while maintaining benchmark exposure
