= FTSE Developed Europe Index =

Index of European stocks

The FTSE Developed Europe Index is an index of European stocks, part of the FTSE Global Equity Index Series. It is a subset of the FTSE Europe Index. The FTSE Eurobloc Index is a subset of it.

== The FTSE Developed Europe Ex UK Index ==
The FTSE Developed Europe ex UK Index comprises large (45%) and mid (55%) cap stocks covering 15 Developed markets in Europe excluding the UK. It was launched on June 30, 2000. The Base Date is December 31, 1986.

The index is derived from the FTSE Global Equity Index Series (GEIS), which covers 98% of the world's investable market capitalisation.

Stocks are free-float weighted. The index follows the Industry Classification Benchmark.

== Constituents of the FTSE Developed Europe ex UK Index ==
Country	Constituents	Market Cap(USDbn)	Weight(%)
Austria	11	73	1.14
Belgium/Luxembourg	16	144	2.26
Denmark	12	110	1.73
Finland	11	161	2.53
France	72	1,503	23.57
Germany	51	1,029	16.12
Greece	12	95	1.49
Ireland	8	104	1.63
Italy	44	602	9.43
Netherlands	21	485	7.61
Norway	11	115	1.8
Portugal	8	53	0.84
Spain	33	622	9.74
Sweden	33	369	5.79
Switzerland	33	914	14.33
Total	376	6,380	100

== See also ==
- Stoxx Europe 50
