= STOXX Europe 50 =

Pan-European stock market index

STOXX Europe 50 month-end closes since December 1986 (logarithmic scale)

The STOXX Europe 50 is a stock index of 50 large companies from developed European countries, designed and administered by STOXX Ltd., an index provider that is part of the ISS STOXX group, majority-owned by Deutsche Börse Group. The index was introduced in February 1998.

The STOXX Europe 50 provides a blue-chip representation of supersector leaders in Europe: its components are selected from the STOXX Europe 600 by free-float market capitalisation. Unlike the EURO STOXX 50, which is limited to the Eurozone, it also includes companies from countries such as the United Kingdom, Switzerland and Denmark. The index has a base value of 1,000 as of 31 December 1991; values back to December 1986 have been calculated by STOXX.

It is licensed to financial institutions to serve as underlying for a wide range of investment products such as exchange-traded funds (ETFs), futures, options, and structured products worldwide. Versions excluding the financial services industry or the banking sector respectively are also available.

== Methodology ==
The index is weighted according to free-float market capitalisation, with each component capped at 10% at quarterly reviews, and is calculated in price, net return and gross return versions in euros, US dollars and other currencies. The composition is reviewed annually in September, using data as of the last trading day of August. For each of the 20 STOXX Europe 600 supersector indices (19 until the September 2020 review), the largest stocks by free-float market capitalisation are added to a selection list until coverage approaches 60% of the corresponding supersector; all current components are also added. The largest 40 stocks on the resulting list are selected, and the remaining 10 places go to the largest current components ranked between 41 and 60.

Between reviews, components are monitored monthly: a stock ranked 75th or lower on the selection list for two consecutive months is removed and replaced by the highest-ranked non-component. Each quarter, a non-component ranked in the top 25 of the selection list is added in place of the smallest component. Stocks deleted for other reasons, such as takeovers, are replaced immediately to keep the number of components fixed.

== Record values ==
During the dot-com bubble the index peaked at 5,183.24 points on 2 May 2000. Its record close is 5,548.17 points, reached on 11 August 2026.

== Components ==
The following companies have been components of the index since the annual review effective 21 September 2026, when Barclays was added and Prosus was removed. Country and supersector are as assigned by STOXX. Tickers and ISINs link to each stock's page on the website of its main listing exchange.

Company	Ticker	ISIN	Main listing	Country	Supersector
ABB	ABBN	CH0012221716	SIX Swiss Exchange	Switzerland	Industrial Goods and Services
Air Liquide	AI	FR0000120073	Euronext	France	Chemicals
Airbus	AIR	NL0000235190	Euronext	France	Industrial Goods and Services
Allianz	ALV	DE0008404005	Frankfurt Stock Exchange	Germany	Insurance
Anheuser-Busch InBev	ABI	BE0974293251	Euronext	Belgium	Food, Beverage and Tobacco
ASML Holding	ASML	NL0010273215	Euronext	Netherlands	Technology
AstraZeneca	AZN	GB0009895292	London Stock Exchange	United Kingdom	Healthcare
AXA	CS	FR0000120628	Euronext	France	Insurance
Banco Santander	SAN	ES0113900J37	Bolsa de Madrid	Spain	Banks
Barclays	BARC	GB0031348658	London Stock Exchange	United Kingdom	Banks
BBVA	BBVA	ES0113211835	Bolsa de Madrid	Spain	Banks
BNP Paribas	BNP	FR0000131104	Euronext	France	Banks
BP	BP.	GB0007980591	London Stock Exchange	United Kingdom	Energy
British American Tobacco	BATS	GB0002875804	London Stock Exchange	United Kingdom	Food, Beverage and Tobacco
Compagnie Financière Richemont	CFR	CH0210483332	SIX Swiss Exchange	Switzerland	Consumer Products and Services
Deutsche Telekom	DTE	DE0005557508	Frankfurt Stock Exchange	Germany	Telecommunications
Enel	ENEL	IT0003128367	Borsa Italiana	Italy	Utilities
EssilorLuxottica	EL	FR0000121667	Euronext	France	Healthcare
GSK	GSK	GB00BN7SWP63	London Stock Exchange	United Kingdom	Healthcare
Hermès	RMS	FR0000052292	Euronext	France	Consumer Products and Services
HSBC	HSBA	GB0005405286	London Stock Exchange	United Kingdom	Banks
Iberdrola	IBE	ES0144580Y14	Bolsa de Madrid	Spain	Utilities
ING Group	INGA	NL0011821202	Euronext	Netherlands	Banks
Intesa Sanpaolo	ISP	IT0000072618	Borsa Italiana	Italy	Banks
L'Oréal	OR	FR0000120321	Euronext	France	Consumer Products and Services
London Stock Exchange Group	LSEG	GB00B0SWJX34	London Stock Exchange	United Kingdom	Financial Services
LVMH	MC	FR0000121014	Euronext	France	Consumer Products and Services
Munich Re	MUV2	DE0008430026	Frankfurt Stock Exchange	Germany	Insurance
National Grid	NG.	GB00BDR05C01	London Stock Exchange	United Kingdom	Utilities
Nestlé	NESN	CH0038863350	SIX Swiss Exchange	Switzerland	Food, Beverage and Tobacco
Novartis	NOVN	CH0012005267	SIX Swiss Exchange	Switzerland	Healthcare
Novo Nordisk (B shares)	NOVO B	DK0062498333	Nasdaq Copenhagen	Denmark	Healthcare
RELX	REL	GB00B2B0DG97	London Stock Exchange	United Kingdom	Technology
Rheinmetall	RHM	DE0007030009	Frankfurt Stock Exchange	Germany	Industrial Goods and Services
Rio Tinto	RIO	GB0007188757	London Stock Exchange	United Kingdom	Basic Resources
Roche (participation certificates)	ROP	CH1499059983	SIX Swiss Exchange	Switzerland	Healthcare
Rolls-Royce Holdings	RR.	GB00B63H8491	London Stock Exchange	United Kingdom	Industrial Goods and Services
Safran	SAF	FR0000073272	Euronext	France	Industrial Goods and Services
Sanofi	SAN	FR0000120578	Euronext	France	Healthcare
SAP	SAP	DE0007164600	Frankfurt Stock Exchange	Germany	Technology
Schneider Electric	SU	FR0000121972	Euronext	France	Industrial Goods and Services
Shell	SHEL	GB00BP6MXD84	London Stock Exchange	United Kingdom	Energy
Siemens	SIE	DE0007236101	Frankfurt Stock Exchange	Germany	Industrial Goods and Services
Siemens Energy	ENR	DE000ENER6Y0	Frankfurt Stock Exchange	Germany	Energy
TotalEnergies	TTE	FR0000120271	Euronext	France	Energy
UBS Group	UBSG	CH0244767585	SIX Swiss Exchange	Switzerland	Financial Services
UniCredit	UCG	IT0005239360	Borsa Italiana	Italy	Banks
Unilever	ULVR	GB00BVZK7T90	London Stock Exchange	United Kingdom	Personal Care, Drug and Grocery Stores
Vinci	DG	FR0000125486	Euronext	France	Construction and Materials
Zurich Insurance Group	ZURN	CH0011075394	SIX Swiss Exchange	Switzerland	Insurance

Components by country (since 21 September 2026)
Country	Companies
France	13
United Kingdom	13
Germany	7
Switzerland	7
Italy	3
Spain	3
Netherlands	2
Belgium	1
Denmark	1
Total	50

Components by supersector (since 21 September 2026)
Supersector	Companies
Banks	8
Healthcare	7
Industrial Goods and Services	7
Consumer Products and Services	4
Energy	4
Insurance	4
Food, Beverage and Tobacco	3
Technology	3
Utilities	3
Financial Services	2
Basic Resources	1
Chemicals	1
Construction and Materials	1
Personal Care, Drug and Grocery Stores	1
Telecommunications	1
Total	50

== See also ==
- EURO STOXX 50, a similar index limited to the Eurozone
- STOXX Europe 600, a similar index covering approximately 90% of the free-float market capitalization of the European stock market
- S&P Europe 350
- FTSE Developed Europe Index
