= OMX Stockholm 30 =

Blue chip stock market index

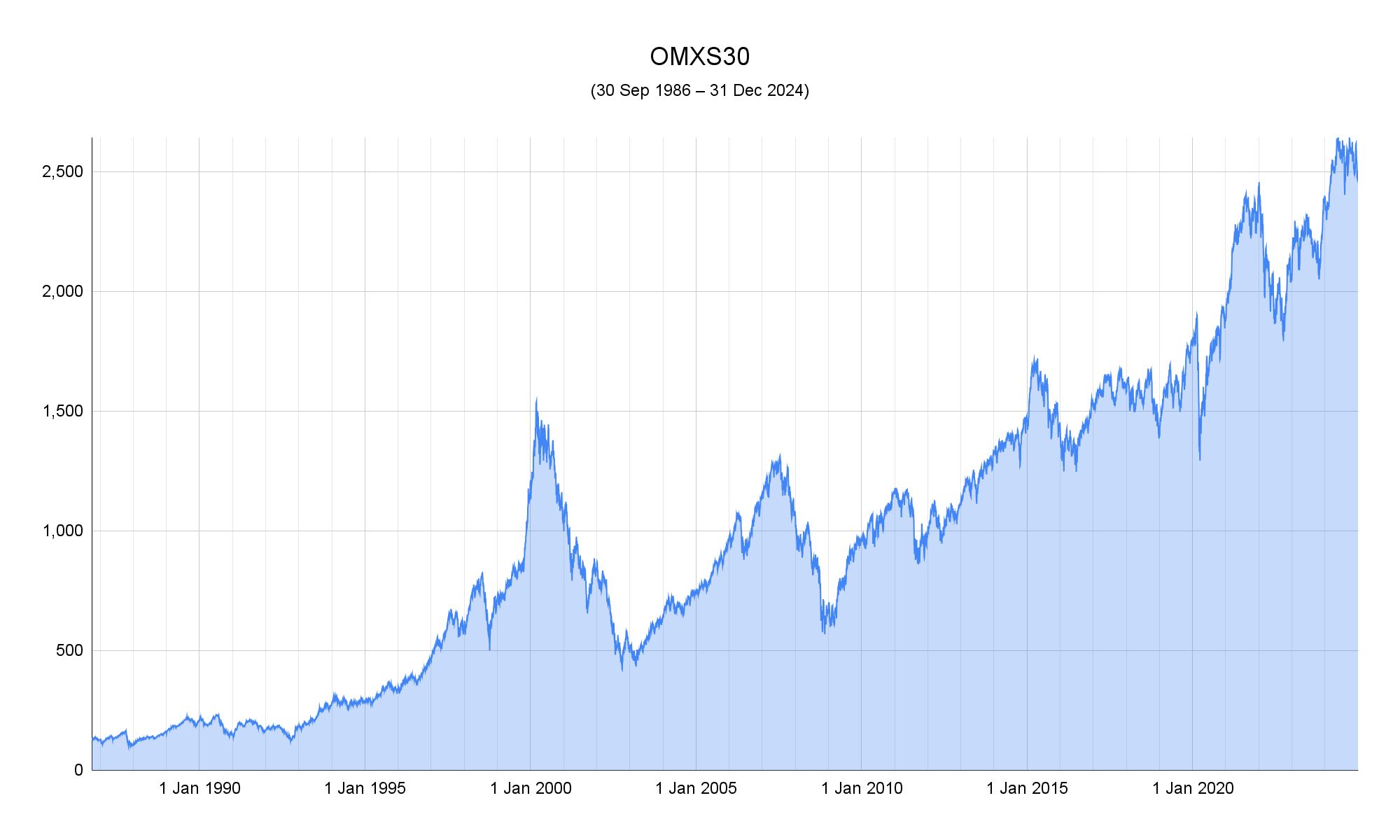
- OMXS30 index performance between 1986 and 2024
- Foundation: 30 September 1986
- Operator: Nasdaq, Inc.
- Exchanges: Nasdaq Stockholm
- Constituents: 30
- Type: Large cap
- Weighting method: Modified free float capitalization-weighted
- Website: Official website
- ISIN: SE0000337842
- Reuters: .OMXS30
- Bloomberg: OMX:IND

The OMX Stockholm 30 (OMXS30) is a stock market index for the 30 largest and most traded stocks on the Nasdaq Stockholm stock exchange. It is a price return and modified free float capitalization-weighted index.

The OMXS30 index started on 30 September 1986 with a base value of 125 and it is reconstituted and rebalanced semi-annually on the first trading day in January and July. The original name of the index was just OMX, but it was changed to OMXS30 on 15 November 2004.

On 1 July 2025, Nasdaq changed the methodology for the OMXS30 index. Previously the criteria for inclusion of a company's stock in the index was based on liquidity. After the change the primary criterion for inclusion is the free float market capitalization of the company. To still ensure good liquidity there is a minimum liquidity requirement of 50 million SEK in average daily value traded over a six month period. The updated methodology only allows one share class to be included in the index and no security can exceed 15 percent of the index. The constituent weighting was also changed to a free float adjusted market capitalization weighting.

On 15 April 2008, Nasdaq launched a total return version of the OMX Stockholm 30 index, the OMX Stockholm 30 Gross Index (OMXS30GI). Unlike the regular OMXS30 index, the OMXS30GI includes reinvested dividends.

== Index composition ==
OMX Stockholm 30 index composition as of 1 July 2025.

Ticker	Company	GICS sector
ABB.ST	ABB Ltd	Industrials
ADDT-B.ST	Addtech B	Industrials
ALFA.ST	Alfa Laval	Industrials
ASSA-B.ST	Assa Abloy B	Industrials
AZN.ST	AstraZeneca	Health Care
ATCO-A.ST	Atlas Copco A	Industrials
BOL.ST	Boliden	Materials
EPI-A.ST	Epiroc A	Industrials
EQT.ST	EQT	Financials
ERIC-B.ST	Ericsson B	Information Technology
ESSITY-B.ST	Essity B	Consumer Staples
EVO.ST	Evolution	Consumer Discretionary
SHB-A.ST	Handelsbanken A	Financials
HM-B.ST	Hennes & Mauritz B	Consumer Discretionary
HEXA-B.ST	Hexagon B	Information Technology
INDU-C.ST	Industrivärden C	Financials
INVE-B.ST	Investor B	Financials
LIFCO-B.ST	Lifco B	Industrials
NIBE-B.ST	Nibe Industrier B	Industrials
NDA-SE.ST	Nordea Bank Abp	Financials
SAAB-B.ST	Saab B	Industrials
SAND.ST	Sandvik	Industrials
SCA-B.ST	SCA B	Materials
SEB-A.ST	SEB A	Financials
SKA-B.ST	Skanska B	Industrials
SKF-B.ST	SKF B	Industrials
SWED-A.ST	Swedbank A	Financials
TEL2-B.ST	Tele2 B	Communication Services
TELIA.ST	Telia Company	Communication Services
VOLV-B.ST	Volvo B	Industrials

== Contract specifications ==
The OMX Stockholm 30 Index futures contracts are traded on the Nasdaq Nordic Derivatives exchange. The contract specifications are shown below:

OMX Stockholm 30 Index
Tick Size:	0.01
Tick Value:	0.25 SEK
Big Point Value (BPV):	25
Denomination:	SEK
Decimal Place:	2

== Annual returns ==
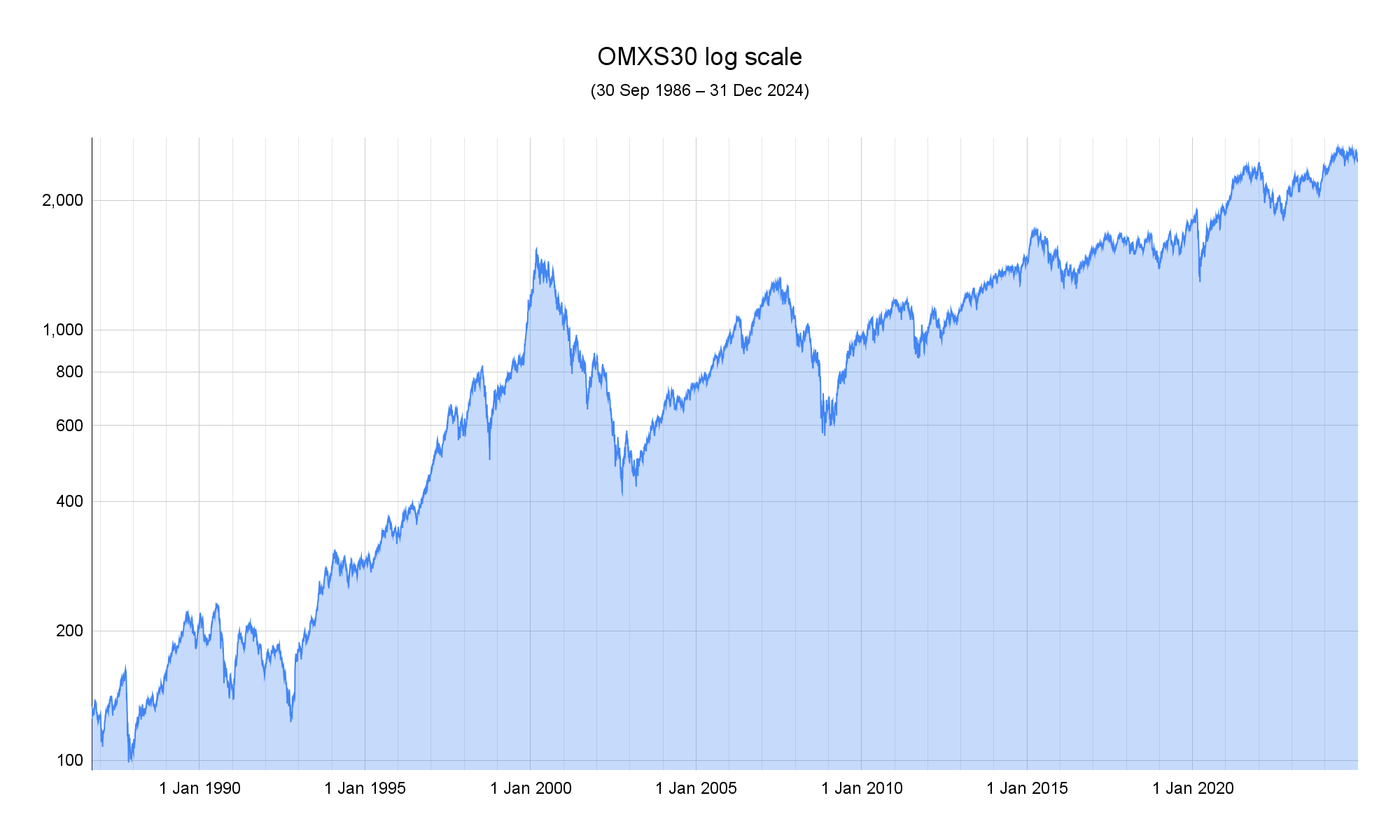
OMXS30 index 1986–2024 (log scale)

The following table shows the annual development of the OMX Stockholm 30 since 1986.

Year	Closing level	Change in index	
Year	Closing level	points	percent
1986	126.18		
1987	105.15	−21.03	−16.67 %
1988	159.63	54.48	51.81 %
1989	208.48	48.85	30.60 %
1990	150.33	−58.15	−27.89 %
1991	166.89	16.56	11.02 %
1992	179.64	12.75	7.64 %
1993	274.99	95.35	53.08 %
1994	284.40	9.41	3.42 %
1995	337.96	53.56	18.83 %
1996	469.29	131.33	38.86 %
1997	599.71	130.42	27.79 %
1998	701.31	101.60	16.94 %
1999	1,198.97	497.66	70.96 %
2000	1,056.11	−142.86	−11.92 %
2001	846.49	−209.62	−19.85 %
2002	493.20	−353.29	−41.74 %
2003	636.29	143.09	29.01 %
2004	741.88	105.59	16.59 %
2005	960.01	218.13	29.40 %
2006	1,147.27	187.26	19.51 %
2007	1,081.44	−65.83	−5.74 %
2008	662.33	−419.11	−38.75 %
2009	951.72	289.39	43.69 %
2010	1,155.57	203.85	21.42 %
2011	987.85	−167.72	−14.51 %
2012	1,104.73	116.88	11.83 %
2013	1,332.95	228.22	20.66 %
2014	1,464.55	131.60	9.87 %
2015	1,446.82	−17.73	−1.21 %
2016	1,517.20	70.38	4.86 %
2017	1,576.94	59.74	3.94 %
2018	1,408.74	−168.20	−10.67 %
2019	1,771.85	363.11	25.78 %
2020	1,874.74	102.89	5.81 %
2021	2,419.73	544.99	29.07 %
2022	2,043.40	−376.33	−15.55 %
2023	2,396.07	352.67	17.26 %
2024	2,483.12	87.05	3.63 %
