= Rosebank Industries =

British turnaround company

Rosebank Industries plc
- Type: Public
- Traded as: LSE: ROSE
- Founded: 2024
- Headquarters: London, United Kingdom,
- Key people: Justin Dowley (Chairman); Simon Peckham (CEO)
- Services: Industrial recovery
- Revenue: ▲£445 million (2025)
- Operating income: ▼£(46) million (2025)
- Net income: ▼£(48) million (2025)
- Website: www.rosebankindustries.com

Rosebank Industries plc (LSE: ROSE), is a large British industrial company specialising in turnaround situations. The company is listed on the London Stock Exchange and is a constituent of the FTSE 250 Index.

== History ==
The company was established Simon Peckham and six former executives from Melrose Industries, to buy, improve and sell underperforming businesses, in June 2024. It was the subject of an initial public offering on the Alternative Investment Market in July 2024. It acquired an American electrical business, Electrical Components International, for £1.4 billion, in June 2025. The company moved from the Alternative Investment Market to the main market in May 2026.
