= Hill & Smith =

British company

Hill & Smith PLC
- Company type: Public limited company
- Traded as: LSE: HILS; FTSE 250 component
- Industry: Infrastructure
- Founded: 1824
- Headquarters: Solihull, West Midlands, United Kingdom
- Key people: Alan Giddins, (Executive Chair)
- Revenue: ▲£868.8 million (2025)
- Operating income: ▲£151.3 million (2025)
- Net income: ▲£82.5 million (2025)
- Website: www.hsgroup.com

Hill & Smith PLC is a business involved in the design, manufacture and supply of products for the construction and infrastructure industries. It is listed on the London Stock Exchange and is a constituent of the FTSE 250 Index.

== History ==
The company was originally founded by Edward Hill as Hill's Ironworks in 1824. It was initially based at Brierley Hill. During 1853, the business was reorganised as a partnership between Edward Hill and Henry Smith; it was at this point that the name Hill & Smith was first adopted. Historic projects undertaken by the firm included fencing for Queen Victoria in 1860, ornamental gates the King Chulalongkorn of Siam in around 1900, materials for the Naval Base Simon's Town in 1910 and components for the Sydney Harbour Bridge in 1932. Hill & Smith played an active role in Britain's war economy during both world wars, during which it provided bespoke engineering services.

During 1922, the company made a key decision to orientate towards the provision of public fixtures, such as steel railings and bridges; this marked the start of a shift towards public safety and security work that the company would maintain into the twenty-first century. In March 1969, Hill & Smith was listed on the London Stock Exchange. Throughout the 1970s, it worked on a new product line in the form of crash barriers for the Department of Transport; these barriers, which were fabricated in the company's own galvanising plant, became the first British-tested restraint systems on the market. In 1986, under the firm's growth strategy at that time, H&S Holdings was established. One year later, the Australian manufacturer W. H. Barkers and Sons was acquired by H&S Holdings, after which it started manufacturing crash barriers for the firm.

The early twenty-first century saw the implementation of an expansionist strategy, which was fueled via a series of acquisitions. During 2005, the company acquired Techspan Systems in exchange for £0.9 million. Three years later, Hill & Smith announced that, as part of the expansion of its HS Roads and Security operations into the North American market, an Ohio-based subsidiary Hill & Smith Inc. had been established. It promptly decided to embark on the supply of portable steel crash barriers, which had become commonplace in Europe but were unfamiliar in the US market at that time. Within two decades, Hill & Smith Inc. was operating multiple manufacturing locations across the United States.

In August 2012, Hill & Smith bought Expamet for £0.5 million. In November 2015, it purchased Hull Galvanising in exchange for £15.5 million. That same year, a planned acquisition of W Corbett & Co (Galvanizing) Limited by Joseph Ash Limited, a subsidiary of Hill & Smith, was abandoned. In 2018, the temporary traffic control manufacturer Work Area Protection was acquired by Hill & Smith Inc. In February 2019, the company acquired hostile vehicle mitigation (HVM) specialists ATG Access for £22.5 million. In October 2021, Hill & Smith announced the sale of its urban driving environment division Variable Message Signs to Pilot Group.

During 2022, Hill & Smith Infrastructure was created. That same year, it was announced that Hill & Smith had acquired the US-based solar lighting company National Signal Inc. for $25.3 million; separately, it also bought the UK-based firm Widnes Galvanising Limited for £3.7 million. Furthermore, the company changed its name from Hill & Smith Holdings plc to Hill & Smith plc on 3 November 2022. During the early-to-mid 2020s, the company saw its year-on-year earnings grow steadily.

In March 2023, the company acquired Korns Galvanizing via deal worth £9.4 million. In January 2024, it acquired the US-based structural steel supplier Capital Steel Service in exchange for roughly £5 million. During September of that year, the firm acquired the American energy infrastructure component manufacturer Whitlow Electric Service via a deal valued at around £23 million.
