= Softcat =

Computer hardware company in England

- Type: Public limited company
- Traded as: LSE: SCT; FTSE 250 component
- Industry: Information technology
- Founded: 1993
- Founder: Peter Kelly
- Headquarters: Marlow, Buckinghamshire
- Number of locations: 14
- Key people: Graeme Watt (Chairman); Graham Charlton (CEO), Katy Mecklenburgh (CFO)
- Revenue: ▲£1,975.1 million (2026)
- Operating income: ▲£196.4 million (2026)
- Net income: ▲£150.3 million (2026)
- Website: softcat.com

Softcat is a Marlow-based IT infrastructure provider founded by Peter Kelly in 1993. The company is listed on the London Stock Exchange and it is a constituent of the FTSE 250 Index.

== History ==
=== 1993–2015: Softcat as a limited company ===
Founded originally as Wardswift, Softcat was founded by Peter Kelly on 30 March 1993 in High Wycombe, under its original business name 'Software Catalogue'. In December 2005, Martin Hellawell became managing director (later CEO) of the company. In April 2006, the company moved its headquarters to Marlow.

=== 2015–present: Softcat as a public limited company ===
The company was the subject of an initial public offering on the London Stock Exchange in November 2015. In March 2016, the company was promoted to the FTSE 250 Index. In March 2018, Hellawell stepped down as CEO and became chairman. On 1 April 2018, Hellawell was replaced by Graeme Watt as CEO.

In 2016, Softcat opened an office in Glasgow, Scotland making it the company's first office outside of England. In 2018, it announced that it would be opening an office in Dublin, Ireland making it the company's first office outside of the United Kingdom. In October 2019 Softcat opened its ninth office, in Birmingham. Since then, Softcat has opened international offices in Washington DC, Singapore, Hong Kong, Sydney, and Amsterdam.

== Explain IT Podcast ==
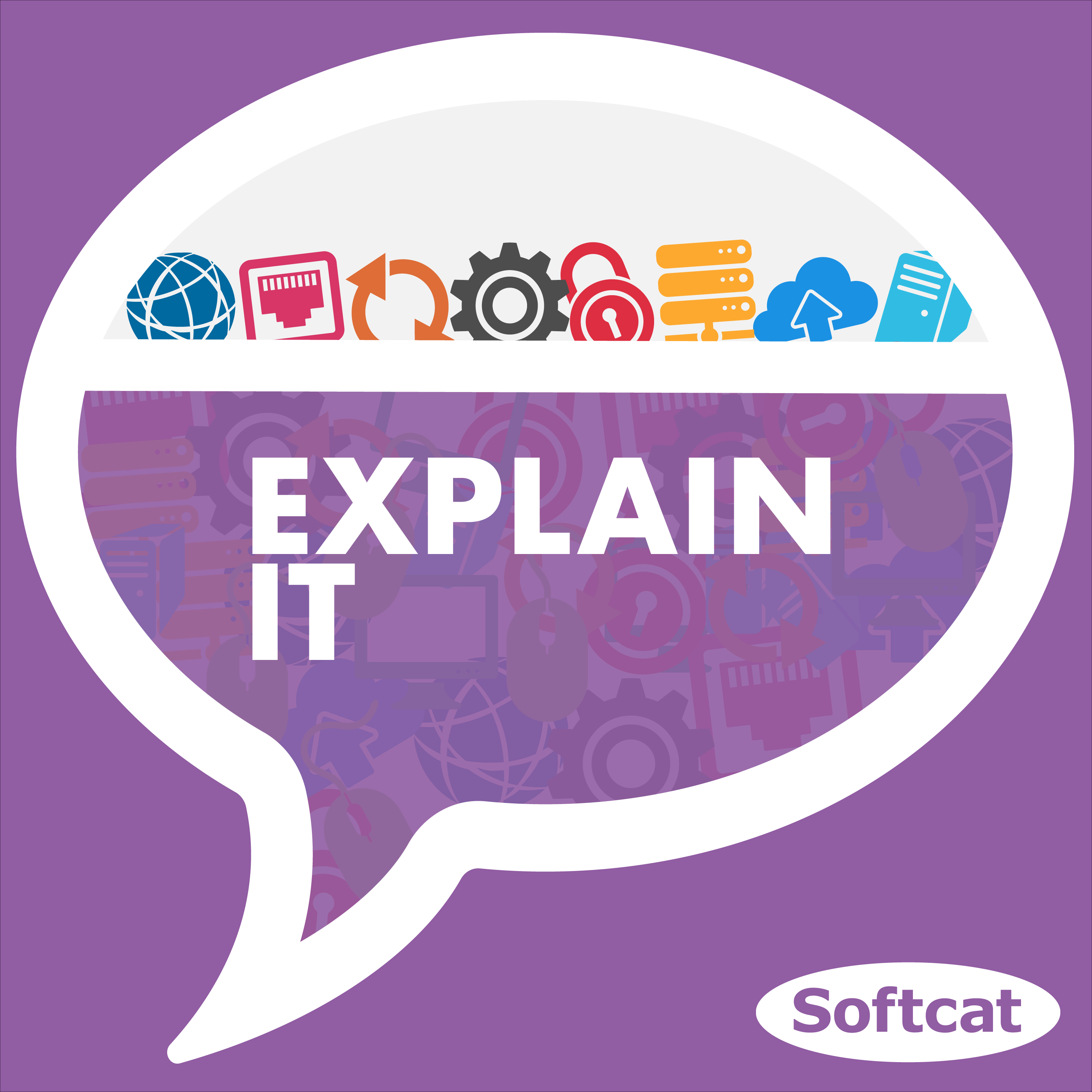
Logo for the Explain IT podcast

On 14 March 2018, Softcat launched a podcast, Explain IT. During its first season, Explain IT charted at Number 39 on the UK iTunes podcast chart. In December 2018, Softcat announced on its podcast feed that it would be launching a second season in January 2019. On 3 January 2019, Explain IT launched its second season. On 4 July 2019, Explain IT won the award for 'Best Marketing Campaign' at the 2019 CRN Sales and Marketing Awards.

=== Season 1 ===
No.	Title	Original release date
S01E01	"Ransomware"	April 4, 2018
What it is, why you should care about it and how an organisation might protect themselves against it.
S01E02	"Social Engineering"	April 18, 2018
What exactly it is, who is behind it, how an organisation might protect themselves against it
S01E03	"Moving to Windows 10"	May 2, 2018
Preparing your organisation for the plunge into Microsoft Windows 10
S01E04	"Hyper-converged infrastructure"	May 16, 2018
We talk about hyper-converged infrastructure and how it's worked for engineering company Laing O'Rourke.
S01E05	"Digital Transformation"	June 6, 2018
All companies should be considering Digital Transformation, this podcast outlines four simple steps to follow.
S01E06	"Dealing with an IT Security Incident"	June 20, 2018
Six steps to follow when you experience a security incident or breach on your network.
S01E07	"GDPR"	July 4, 2018
We tackle the ins and outs of GDPR compliance.
S01E08	"Cloud"	July 25, 2018
We provide a five-step process for a successful move to cloud.

=== Season 2 ===
No.	Title	Original release date
S02E01	"2019 Tech Predictions"	January 3, 2019
Our Tech Predictions For 2019.
S02E02	"AI and Machine Learning"	January 16, 2019
What is artificial intelligence and how can it help organisations today? Featuring Hewlett Packard Enterprise
S02E03	"The Future of IT in Healthcare"	January 30, 2019
What is the future of IT in healthcare? Featuring Bolton NHS Foundation Trust
S02E04	"Security Trends"	February 27, 2019
What is trending in the world of security, and how can your organisation protect itself? Featuring Check Point
S02E05	"5G"	March 13, 2019
5G. What is it, how does it work and what's in it for organisations?
S02E06	"Supply Chain Attacks"	March 27, 2019
Supply Chain Attacks. What is it, how did it come about and how can you stop them?
S02E07	"Rise of the machines"	April 10, 2019
Are the machines taking over?
S02E08	"Unstructured Data"	May 8, 2019
What is unstructured data?
S02E09	"Quantum Computing"	May 22, 2019
What is quantum computing and what impacts will it have on the future?
S02E10	"Multicloud"	June 5, 2019
What is multicloud and when is it going to get here?
S02E10	"The future of work and the workplace"	June 19, 2019
Looking at the future of work and the workplace?
