= Addtech =

Swedish technology company

Addtech AB
- Type: Publicly traded Aktiebolag
- Traded as: Nasdaq Stockholm: ADDT B; OMXS30 component
- Industry: Technology trading
- Founded: The original company Bergman & Beving was founded 1906. In 2001, Addtech was listed on the NASDAQ OMX Stockholm exchange.
- Headquarters: Stockholm, Sweden
- Key people: CEO: Niklas Stenberg
- Revenue: SEK 14 billion (2021/2022 Annual report)
- Number of employees: 3 500

Addtech AB is a Swedish, publicly listed technical solutions group. Addtech consists of approximately 140 subsidiaries with a total of about 3500 employees. The group is active within niche markets for high-tech products and solutions. The customers are largely Nordic companies within the manufacturing industry. Addtech has yearly sales of SEK 14 billion and sells to more than 40 countries.

== Business areas ==
Operations are organized in five business areas: Automation, Electrification, Energy, Industrial Solutions and Process Technology.

== Market ==
Addtech’s operational focus is on the Nordic countries, although markets outside the region have grown in importance in recent years. The operations beyond the Nordics are in the UK, Germany, Austria, Switzerland, Poland, Estonia, Latvia, Japan, USA and China. In addition to this, the Group exports to more than 20 other countries.

== History ==
Addtech originates from the company Bergman & Beving, which was founded in 1906 and went public in 1976. The division of operations into business areas, and the combination of decentralization and own responsibility, were already catchwords at the time of Bergman & Beving, and has laid the foundation for the business philosophy of today's Addtech. In 2001, Bergman & Beving divided operations into three independent subsidiaries, each of which is listed on the Nasdaq OMX Stockholm, also called Stockholm Stock Exchange. Three new companies were born; Bergman & Beving, Lagercrantz Group, and Addtech. Since Addtech's listing in 2001, more than 100 corporate acquisitions have been made.
