= Argenx =

Pharmaceutical company in Ghent, Belgium

argenx SE
- Type: Public
- Traded as: Euronext Brussels: ARGX
- ISIN: NL0010832176
- Industry: Biotechnology
- Founded: 2008
- Headquarters: Breda, Ghent
- Key people: Tim van Hauwermeiren, CEO Peter Verhaeghe, chairman
- Revenue: €4.2 billion (2025)
- Net income: 792,700,000 euro (2024)
- Number of employees: 1,863
- Website: www.argenx.com

Argenx SE is a Belgian-Dutch pharmaceutical company specializing in immunology. Argenx specializes in the development of antibody therapies for the treatment of autoimmune diseases and cancer. Its work primarily focuses on the development of orphan drugs.

== History ==
In 2008, Argenx, based in Ghent, was founded by three scientists: Tim Van Hauwermeiren, a former executive at Ablynx, and two of his colleagues, Hans de Haard and Torsten Dreier. Their aim was to bring new drugs for the treatment of autoimmune diseases to the market. Through collaboration with researchers, including the scientist Sally Ward, they developed a new generation of medicines targeting Immunoglobulin G autoantibodies.

In order to finance research, development, applications for marketing authorization and the commercialization of its medicines, the company was listed in the United States on the Nasdaq and in Belgium on the Brussels Stock Exchange, where it was added to the BEL 20 in June 2018.

In 2021, the company received marketing authorization from the United States Food and Drug Administration for its first medicine, Vyvgart (active substance: efgartigimod alfa), for the treatment of myasthenia gravis.

In 2023, the company experienced two setbacks in attempts to broaden the indications for its flagship medicine Vyvgart: clinical studies for the treatment of immune thrombocytopenic purpura (ITP) and then pemphigus were inconclusive.

In April 2025, the US FDA approved a prefilled syringe version of the company's immune disorder drug Vyvgart.

In September 2025, Argenx was added to the Euro Stoxx 50 Index.
