= Siemens Energy =

German energy corporation

Siemens Energy AG
- Type: Aktiengesellschaft
- Traded as: FWB: ENR; DAX Component
- Industry: Energy development
- Predecessors: Siemens Energy Sector; Siemens Gas and Power
- Founded: 1 April 2020; 6 years ago Munich
- Headquarters: Munich, Germany
- Key people: Joe Kaeser (Chairman); Christian Bruch (Chief Executive Officer); Maria Ferraro (Chief Financial Officer); Tim Holt (Executive Vice President); Anne-Laure de Chammard (Executive Vice President); Karim Amin (Executive Vice President); Vinod Philip (Executive Vice President)
- Revenue: €39.1 billion (2025)
- Operating income: €2.355 billion (2025)
- Net income: €1.685 billion (2025)
- Total assets: €50.874 billion (2024)
- Owners: Siemens AG (6%); Siemens Pension-Trust (11%); Siemens family (3%)
- Number of employees: 102,000 (2025)
- Divisions: Gas Services, Grid Technologies, Transformation of Industry and Wind Power (Siemens Gamesa)
- Subsidiaries: Siemens Gamesa
- Website: www.siemens-energy.com

Siemens Energy AG is a German publicly traded energy corporation formed through the spin-off of the former Gas and Power division of Siemens, and it includes full ownership of Siemens Gamesa.

Christian Bruch is the CEO, and the former CEO of Siemens AG, Joe Kaeser, is the chairman of the supervisory board.

At an Extraordinary Shareholders' Meeting of Siemens AG on 9 July 2020, its shareholders approved the split-up of the company. Trading of the shares of the new Siemens Energy AG on the Frankfurt Stock Exchange began on 28 September 2020. As of November 2024, Siemens retains a stake of 17% in the company.

Following quality problems with onshore turbines, Siemens Energy share price dropped by nearly 35% between 21–23 June 2023. In October 2023 the company announced it was seeking German government guarantees, following quality problems with rotor blades and gears in its newer onshore wind turbines. The company share price dropped once again sharply on 25 October 2023, but it regained most of this loss by 15 November 2023. In 2024 Siemens Energy shares surged by more than 300%, making it the top performer in the Stoxx 600, with its share price reaching an all time high.

== History ==
The energy division has been an essential part of the company since the foundation of the group by Werner von Siemens and Johann Georg Halske. Important organizational milestones were the founding of Siemens-Schuckertwerke in 1903, the formation of the Power Engineering Division in 1969 in the newly founded Siemens AG, and the bundling of activities in the Siemens Energy Sector in 2008.

Siemens Energy was created as an independent company in April 2020 as a result of a renewed restructuring of the Siemens Group. Siemens transferred its energy division to the new independent company for this purpose.

=== Rebranding to Omterra ===
On July 14, 2026, the company announced a transition to a new independent brand, changing its name to Omterra. Under this new identity, the current global operations of Siemens Energy and its subsidiary, Siemens Gamesa Renewable Energy, will be unified under a single corporate name.

The rebranding process was prompted by the expiration of the fixed-term licensing agreement that governed the use of the "Siemens" trademark following the company's spin-off from Siemens AG in 2020. According to the company, its strategic direction for customers and business partners will remain unchanged. The transition to the Omterra name is set to be implemented progressively throughout the year.

== Products ==
The Group's product range mainly includes:

- Power transmission and distribution (for example, transformers, switchgear, high-voltage direct-current transmission)
- Generators
- Power plant technology
- Low-voltage switchgear: switchgear for load feeders, components for power distribution, control and signaling devices, complete cubicle systems (circuit breakers, etc.)
- Turbines: Wind turbines, steam and gas turbines
- Compressors
- Electrolyzers

== Operations ==
Siemens Energy operates manufacturing facilities in Europe, Asia and the Americas. In Germany, the company manufactures gas turbines in Berlin and power transformers in Nuremberg, where it announced a €220 million factory expansion in 2025.

In Brno, Czechia, Siemens Energy designs and manufactures industrial steam turbines with capacities of up to 150 MW. The factory also provides turbine maintenance and modernization services for customers worldwide. Industrial steam turbines are also manufactured in Vadodara, India.

The company's power-grid equipment manufacturing network includes high-voltage switchgear production in Shanghai and large power transformers manufactured through its joint venture with Končar Group in Zagreb.

In the United States, Siemens Energy manufactures generators and turbine components in Charlotte, North Carolina, where it is expanding into large power transformer production. Its subsidiary Siemens Gamesa manufactures offshore wind-turbine nacelles in Cuxhaven, Germany, and blades in Kingston upon Hull, England.

== Finances ==
	2019	2020	2021	2022	2023	2024	2025
Total revenue (€ bn)	28.9	27.5	28.5	29.0	31.1	34.5	39.1
Net profit (€ bn)	0.1	-1.6	-0.4	-0.4	-3.3	-0.1	2.0
Total assets (€ bn)	45.0	43.0	44.1	51.2	47.9	54.4	61.1
Total equity (€ bn)	13.1	15.4	15.2	17.1	8.8	9.4	10.7
Employees		93,000	92,000	91,000	94,000	98,000	102,985
