= SFS Group =

Company for mechanical fastening systems headquartered in Switzerland

SFS Group AG
- Type: Limited company
- Traded as: SIX: SFSN
- ISIN: CH0239229302
- Industry: Fastening systems and precision components
- Founded: 1928; 98 years ago
- Headquarters: Heerbrugg, St. Gallen, Switzerland
- Key people: Thomas Oetterli; (Chairman); Jens Breu; (CEO)
- Revenue: SFr 3.06 billion (2025)
- Number of employees: 13,646 (2025)
- Website: sfs.com

The SFS Group AG is a supplier of application-critical precision components and assemblies, mechanical fastening systems, quality tools, and procurement solutions.

Headquartered in Heerbrugg, Switzerland, the SFS Group operatres 150 sales and production sites across 35 countries in Asia, Europe and North Amercia. In the 2025 financial year, it generated sales of CHF 3,056.6 million with approximately 13,600 employees (FTE).

Based on its core technologies cold working (or cold forming), deep drawing (or deep drawing technology) injection moulding (or injection molding technology), riveting, secondary operations, and fastening technology, the SFS Group supplies various end markets. These include the automotive, construction, electrical and electronics, and aviation industries, as well as medical devices technology and industrial manufacturing.

== History ==
The history of SFS began in 1928 with a hardware store in Altstätten (Switzerland). In 1949, a branch was opened in nearby Heerbrugg (Switzerland). Motivated by supply shortages, Josef Stadler and Hans Huber decided to set up their own screw manufacturing business and jointly founded SFS Presswerk AG in 1960. The foundation for the development of industrial activities was laid in 1960 with the establishment of an own screw manufacturing facility in Heerbrugg.

Both trading and manufacturing activities were continuously expanded in the following decades. Starting in 1971, the company built up an international network of marketing organizations. In 1993, the activities were consolidated under the umbrella of SFS Holding AG, and in 2014, the name was changed to SFS Group AG and the company went public.

SFS entered the blind riveting technology market in 2008 with the acquisition of GESIPA in Germany. GESIPA has been a global system supplier for blind riveting technology for more than 70 years and develops and manufactures blind rivets, blind rivet nuts, and the corresponding processing and assembly systems for industry and trade.

On September 1, 2012, SFS acquired Unisteel Technology Group, a Singapore-based company operating in the field of miniature fasteners (e.g., for smartphones, lifestyle electronics, and hard disk drives). The company is headquartered in Singapore and has additional production facilities in Malaysia and China.

Since 7 May 2014 SFS is listed on the SIX Swiss Exchange (SIX: SFSN).

In 2016, SFS acquired in Switzerland and Tegra Medical in the United States, increasing its activities in the medical technology sector and adding customers from both companies.

In 2021, the SFS Group acquired its long-standing partner Hoffmann SE headquartered in Germany. This enabled the company to internationalize its trading business and establish a leading position in the field of quality tools.

== Company structure ==
The SFS Group comprises three segments: Engineered Components, Fastening Systems, and Distribution & Logistics, which represent the corresponding business models:

- Engineered Components: Development and manufacturing partner for customer-specific precision components, assemblies and fastening solutions. The business area serves customers in the automotive, electronics and medical device industries, as well as in the aerospace sector and in industrial manufacturing under the SFS, UNISTEEL, Tegra Medical and GESIPA® brands
- Fastening Systems: Application-specific mechanical fastening systems for the construction industry under the SFS, TFC and HECO® brands, among others
- Distribution & Logistics: Quality tools, fasteners and other C-parts as well as procurement solutions for customers in industrial manufacturing with the own brands SFS, Hoffmann Group, GARANT and HOLEX, among others

== Facts and figures ==
	2025 (Swiss GAAP FER)	2024 (Swiss GAAP FER)	2023 (Swiss GAAP FER)	2022 (Swiss GAAP FER)
Sales SFS	CHF 3,056.6 million	CHF 3,039.0 million	CHF 3,090.8 million	CHF 2,746.1 million
EBITDA	CHF 466.6 million	CHF 479.8 million	CHF 486.0 million	CHF 448.1 million
Operating profit (EBIT)	CHF 324.3 million	CHF 350.2 million	CHF 358.6 million	CHF 330.3 million
Net income	CHF 220.2 million	CHF 242.7 million	CHF 268.5 million	CHF 270.6 million
Employees (FTE)	13,646	13,689	13,198	13,282

Source: SFS Group

== Web links ==
- Website SFS
- Annual Report including Sustainability Report SFS
- Join SFS Career page
