= S&P Europe 350 =

European stock index

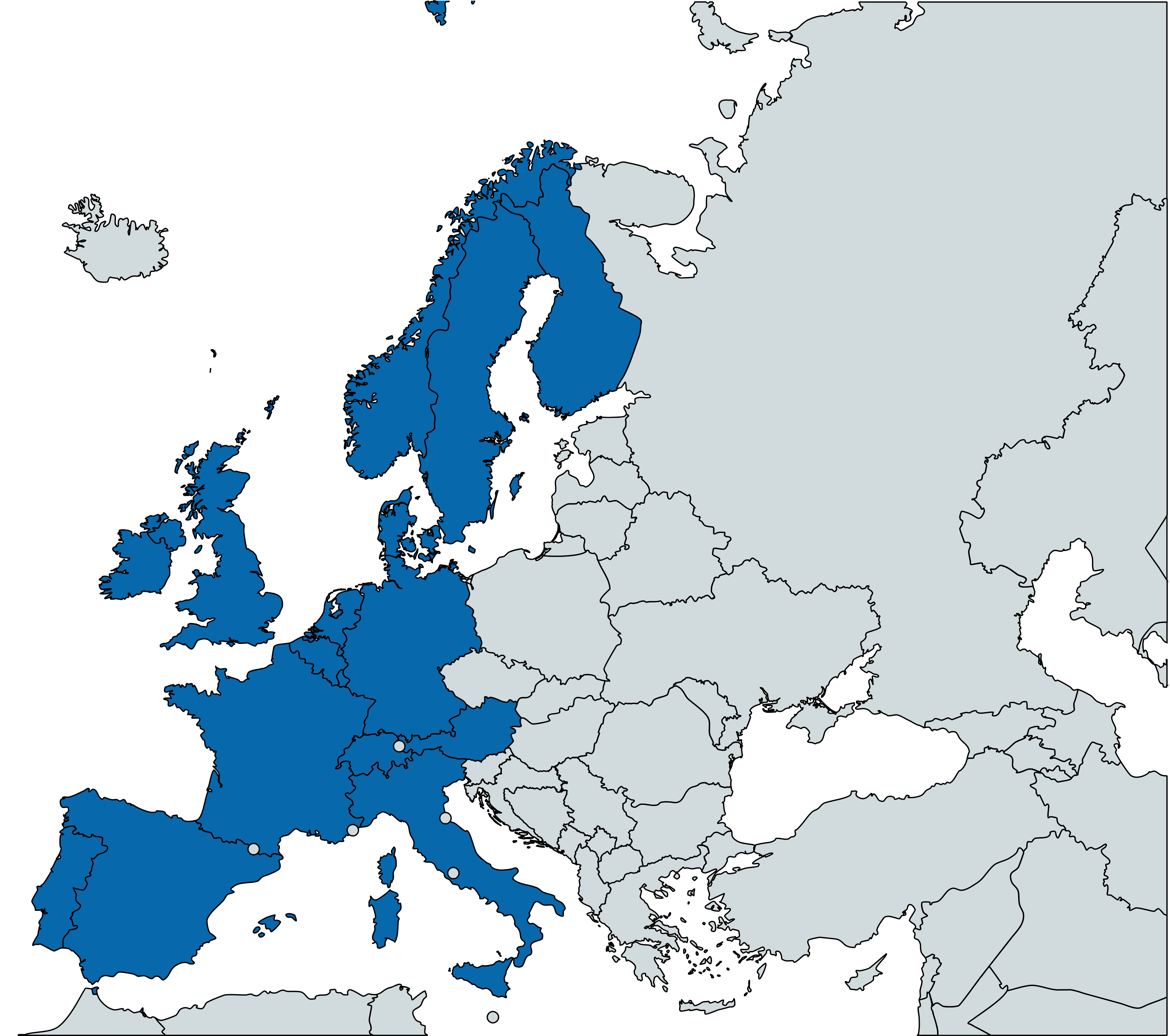
Map of all countries in S&P Europe 350 as of Jan 21, 2019

The S&P Europe 350 Index is a stock index of European stocks.

It is a part of the S&P Global 1200. The constituent shares are selected for relevance to the broad market, including industry sector balance, longevity (to minimize index turnover) and liquidity of the shares.

== Investment ==
This index is tracked by an exchange-traded fund, IShares Europe (NYSE Arca: IEV). Other funds track the FTSE Developed Europe or euro-based indices such as MSCI EMU. In Europe more funds are based on Stoxx Europe 50.

== See also ==
- STOXX Europe 50
- S&P Europe 350 Dividend Aristocrats
- S&P 500
- STOXX Europe 600
