= Besi =

Semiconductor company in the Netherlands

BE Semiconductor Industries N.V.
- Trade name: Besi
- Company type: Public
- Traded as: Euronext Amsterdam: BESI; AEX component
- ISIN: NL0012866412
- Industry: Semiconductors
- Founded: 1995
- Founders: Richard Blickman (CEO since 1995)
- Headquarters: Duiven, The Netherlands
- Area served: Worldwide
- Revenue: €592.8 million (2017)
- Number of employees: 1819 (2022)
- Website: besi.com

BE Semiconductor Industries N.V., commonly known as Besi, is a Dutch multinational company that designs and manufactures semiconductor equipment. Besi offers die attach, packaging, and plating solutions.

== History ==
The company was founded in May, 1995 by Richard Blickman, who still leads the company today. At the end of 2022, Besi had a total of 1,675 permanent and 144 temporary employees. It outsources production to its subsidiaries in China and Malaysia.

Besi is a publicly traded company, and its shares are listed on the Euronext Amsterdam stock market under the BESI ticker symbol. In 2021, Besi was valued at around $5.6 billion.

== Products ==
Besi offers die attach, packaging and plating solutions, with the die attach segment making up 82% of the revenue in 2021. The segment includes Flip Chip, Hybrid Bonding as well as Thermo Compression products among others. In total, Besi had a 42% market share in the segment in 2022, making them the market leader. The company's plating products on the other hand are used mainly for solar cells and connectors, as well as other electric devices.
