= AEX =

AEX may refer to:

- Aex (mythology), a figure in Greek mythology
- AEX index (Amsterdam Exchange index), a stock market index
- ISO 639:aex, a spurious-language code retired in 2008
- Alexandria International Airport (Louisiana), US by IATA code

== See also ==
- AEX cfiXML, an automated information-exchange schema for engineered equipment
- Hexachaeta aex, a species of fruit fly
- AEXS (aromatase excess syndrome), a rare condition that results in excess estrogen
