= Beter Bed =

Dutch holding company

Beter Bed Holding N.V.
- Type: Private
- Industry: Retail
- Founded: 1983
- Founder: Mark Diks; Pieter Diks
- Headquarters: Uden, Netherlands
- Number of locations: 161 (2019)
- Area served: Netherlands, Belgium, Sweden
- Key people: John Kruijssen (CEO); Gabrielle Reijnen (CFO); Bart Karis (Chairman of the supervisory board)
- Products: Bedroom furniture
- Revenue: ▼€185.805 million (2019)
- Operating income: ▲€21.244 million (2019)
- Net income: ▲€4.166 million (2019)
- Total assets: €99.404 million (2019)
- Total equity: €3.035 million (2019)
- Number of employees: 915 (2019)
- Website: Beter Bed Holding

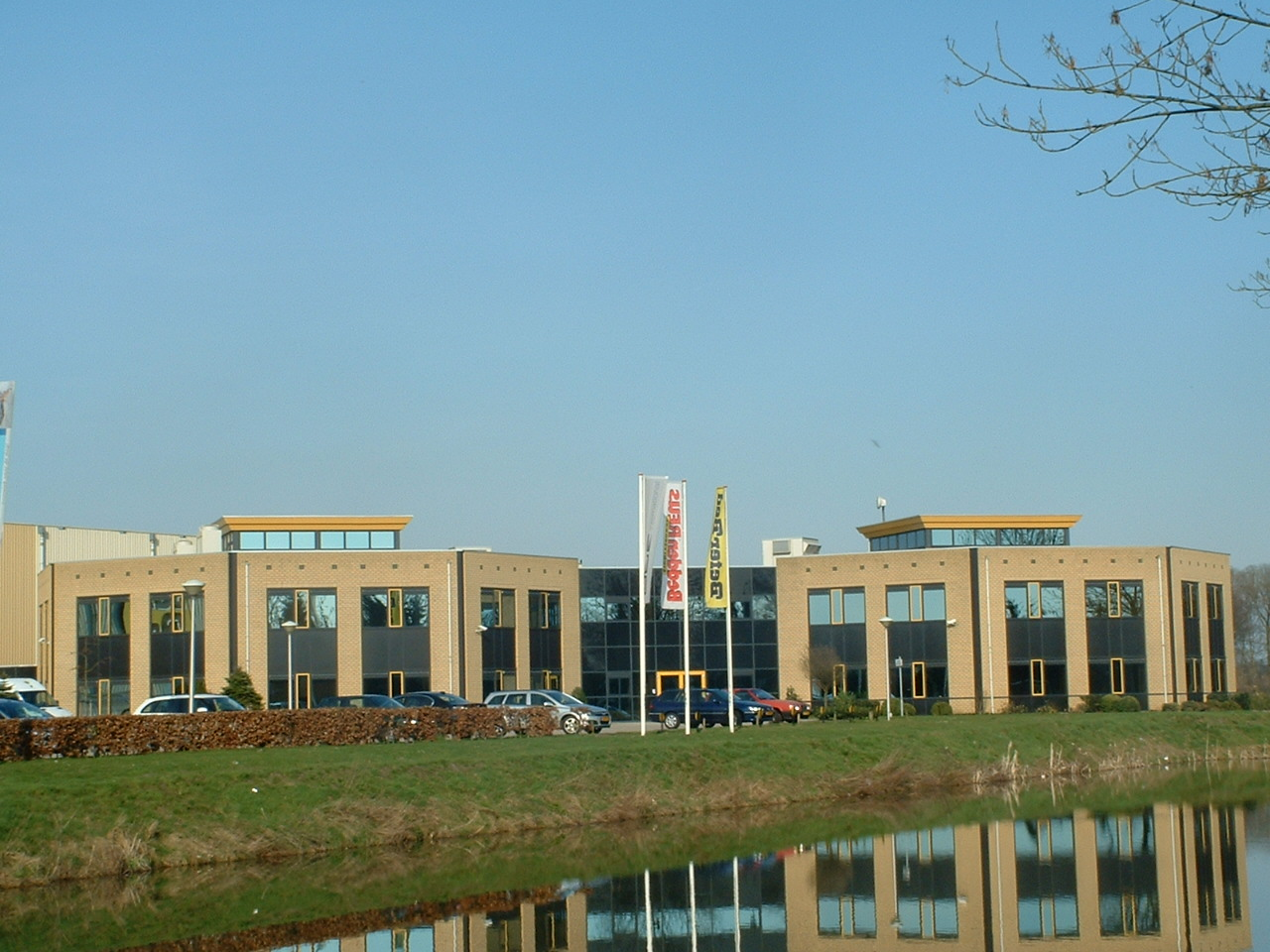
Corporate headquarters of Beter Bed Holding in Uden

Beter Bed Holding N.V. is a Dutch holding company. Through its subsidiaries Beter Bed Holding N.V. trades in bedroom furniture, mattresses and related products. In this line of business Beter Bed N.V is market leader in the Netherlands and was, until the sale of its subsidiary "Matratzen Concord", also market leader in Germany. Since 5 December 1996 Beter Bed N.V.'s shares have been being traded on the Amsterdam Stock Exchange. However, Beter Bed N.V. did not belong to the group of companies that compose the AEX index but was part of the group that compose the Amsterdam Small Cap Index. On 24 September 2018 it was reported that Beter Bed N.V. had been removed from the Amsterdam Small Cap Index.

The corporate headquarters is in Uden, in the Dutch province of North Brabant. Beter Bed Holding N.V. is the mother company of several different brands of chain stores, totalling 161 stores in a number of European countries. These companies operate in various market segments, from cash and carry products to exclusive bedroom furniture, each chain maintaining a unique retail concept. The development and production of, amongst others, orthopaedic mattresses is directed by the subsidiary DBC.

As of 31 December 2019 Beter Bed N.V. employs 915 full-time employees in three European countries.

== History ==
The foundations of what was to become Beter Bed were laid in 1981 by the brothers Mark and Pieter Diks. They raised capital from their father, Jan Diks, co-owner of Dico, managed to secure a modest bank loan and opened their first store in Uden. Shortly afterwards, three stores, specialising in bedroom furniture, had been opened. The official founding year of what is now Beter Bed Holding dates to 1983. At that time stores specialising in bedroom furniture and accompanying products were a new and unfamiliar phenomenon in the Netherlands since this market segment was dominated by large department stores and specialists concentrating on general interiors. The concept of providing high-quality goods and a wide range of products at a low price proved to be successful and was a blueprint for all future activities of Beter Bed. During the second half of the 1980s the company began to grow.

In 1986 Bedden en Bedden B.V., a factory for the production of MDF panels, was established in Uden. In the 1990s two more production facilities were added to the company by acquiring two factories in Poland, Ecowood (1994) and Interwood (1996).

The flotation of Beter Bed Holding N.V. took place in December 1996. Shares of Beter Bed Holding N.V. are traded at the Amsterdam Stock Exchange. In the same year another company was added to the holding by the acquisition of Dormaël, a company that operates in the higher segment of the bedroom furniture market. The following year Beter Baby was founded, with the goal to gain market shares in the trade with bedroom furniture for babies and small children. At the same time Beter Bed N.V. acquired DFC Comfort ensuring the sole right of representation for orthopaedic mattresses and pillows by this company within the Benelux.

In order to comply with the planned expansion and the resulting requirements the company moved to a new location in January 1997, consisting of a larger administrative building and a distribution centre with a surface of 16,000 m^{2}, after construction time of one year.

In the second half of the 1990s the subsidiary Bedden Dump was founded to sell items taken from the Beter Bed range via temporary stores. It was decided in 2002 to expand this format into a discount chain for bedroom furniture according to a cash and carry concept, targeting the lower market segment. In 2005 this company was renamed BeddenReus.

In 1998 the company expanded into Germany by opening the first two stores in Essen and Dortmund. Also in 1998 Beter Bed N.V. acquired the German company Matratzen Concord, whose headquarters is in Cologne.

At the same time Matratzen Concord began its expansion into Austria and Switzerland (1998), as well as the Netherlands (1999), France and Italy (2000). Also in 1998, Mark and Pieter Diks, the holding's founding brothers, sold a large amount of their shares in the company, reducing their commitment to 18%.

The holding's structure began to change in 1999. One of the founding brothers, Pieter Diks, sold his remaining shares and retired from the management. Mark Diks again reduced his share in the company in May 2000 but remained in the management team for the time being. Also in 2000 the production facility Bedden en Bedden was sold off and the subsidiary Dormaël was converted into a franchising format. Following a management buyout Beter Baby was sold off. In August 2000, it was announced that the Blokker family had acquired 15% of Beter Bed's shares.

Mark Diks resigned as CEO and became a member of the supervisory board of the holding in January 2001. At the same time Frans Geelen became new CEO, having joined Beter Bed in August 2000 and after having served as a member of the board of directors of C&A Europe since 1996.

In 2001 all activities of the subsidiary DFC Comfort were discontinued and a new company DBC International was founded. DBC International is active in the development, marketing and selling of mattresses developed under its own direction.

At the end of 2001 Beter Bed N.V. had a total of 555 stores.

In the first half of 2002 investment fund NeSBIC attempted to take over Beter Bed N.V. by offering €16 for every share sold to it. In view of the inadequate offer and simultaneous insecurity with regards to the financial backing, the project ultimately failed. At the same time the remaining founder, Mark Diks, sold his remaining shares and subsequently withdrew from the supervisory board.

Matratzen Concord closed all its stores in Italy and France in 2003 due to disappointing sales figures and the lack of short-term prospects.

Beter Bed's strategy changed during this period, returning to its core activities, the trading and selling of bedroom furniture and accessories and turning away from producing its own goods. As a consequence, in May 2005 the last remaining factory in Poland, Interwood, was sold, the second factory in Poland, Ecowood, had already been closed down in 2004. By the end of 2004 some but not all of the Dormaël stores had gone into receivership, Consequently, in June 2005 the first Slaagenoten stores, a company created by merging most of the remaining vending points of Dormaël, founded in 2000 as a franchise retail format, were opened. However, some of these continued to operate under the name of Dormaël. In September of the same year the Spanish chain El Gigante del Colchón was acquired by Beter Bed N.V. At the time El Gigante del Colchón had 20 stores in the region of Barcelona. At the end of 2008 the company had grown to 47 stores, covering the whole of Catalonia, and expanded into the region of Madrid.

In December 2005 all activities of the subsidiary Beter Bed Deutschland were terminated. The locations were integrated into Matratzen Concord.

In October 2006 a second strategy for selling mattresses in Germany was introduced with the founding of the new subsidiary MAV Matratzen-Abverkauf. Two stores were opened in 2006. At the end of 2008 the company had grown to 30 stores. The activities of MAV Matratzen-Abverkauf were concentrated in the federal state of North Rhine-Westphalia while, at the same time, attempting to expand southwards into Baden-Württemberg.

In September 2007, the first stores of Matratzen Concord were opened in Belgium. By the end of June 2009 the number of stores there has grown to five with the intention to open more in the future.

In the second half of 2008 the first Matratzen Concord store was opened in the Polish capital of Warsaw under the name of Materace Concord. By January 2010 the number of shops of Materace Concord had risen to three.

On 14 April 2009, CEO Frans Geelen announced his intention to resign from the office as chairman of the board of directors by April 2010 the latest. On 9 October 2009, it was revealed that Ton Anbeek, at the time CEO at Koninklijke Auping bv, would succeed Frans Geelen as of 1 March 2010, the appointment being ratified during an extraordinary general meeting of the shareholders of Beter Bed on 5 November 2009.

On 23 April 2009, it was announced that CFO Ric van der Woude had accepted a position as CFO at Zeeman Groep. On 1 September 2009 his responsibilities were taken over by Duncan van Hoeve as non-statutory Finance Director.

In February 2011, it was reported that Beter Bed B.V. and Dutch mail order company Wehkamp had entered into a strategic partnership with the aim of Beter Bed's core range of products also to be sold through Wehkamp's website.

With the opening of the first Beter Bed store in Olen, Belgium on 29 September 2011, Beter Bed B.V. began to expand into the Belgian market.

During the course of 2012, Matratzen Concord terminated all activities of its Polish subsidiary Materace Concord and closed all stores, the number of which had risen to four. The German company MAV Matratzen-Abverkauf also closed its 15 stores in that year. A new retail format, Schlafberater.com, was established in Germany, counting four stores by the end of 2012. By the end of 2013, the four German stores had all closed with one store having been opened in Switzerland. The Swiss store closed during the course of 2014.

On 19 December 2012 it was announced that CFO Duncan van Hoeve would be leaving the company at the end of March 2013. On 1 April 2013 he was succeeded by Bart Koops.

In January 2014 plans were revealed to close all stores of the subsidiary Slaapgenoten during the course of 2014. Furthermore, all Matrassen Concord activities in the Netherlands and Belgium also terminated during the same period.

In 2014 Beter Bed entered the French market when it started a pilot under the name Literie Concorde. At the end of 2015 this retail format operated two stores. The operations in France were to be expanded with the opening of another five to ten stores within the next years.

In September 2015 it was disclosed that Beter Bed was to acquire the Austrian retailer BettenMax with the intention of turning the existing BettenMax stores into stores of Matratzen Concord. This increased the number of Matratzen Concord stores in Austria to 86, making Matratzen Concord market leader in that country. The acquisition was finalised on 22 October 2015.

On 3 June 2016 Beter Bed announced its take-over of Swedish retailer Sängjätten. Sängjätten owns 16 stores and has nine franchise partners. On 20 June the acquisition was completed.

After seven years as CEO of Beter Bed Holding Ton Anbeek left the company on 1 November 2017 to become CEO of Accell Group.

During 2017 all activities of the French subsidiary Literie Concorde were terminated.

On 16 January 2018 it was reported that John Kruijssen will become the new CEO of Beter Bed Holding as of 1 April 2018.

CFO Bart Koops announced on 1 May 2018 that he would be resigning from his post as of 1 August 2018, and on 27 July 2018 it was reported that Hugo van den Ochtend would become his successor as of 1 September 2018.

On 28 September 2018 it was reported that Beter Bed had completed the sale of their Spanish subsidiary El Gigante del Colchón to Spanish competitor Evolución del Descanso with effect of 1 November 2018.

On 17 October 2018 Beter Bed disclosed that subsidiary Matratzen Concord, active in Germany, Austria and Switzerland, would close 178 of its stores as part of a restructuring and re-organisation programme. The closures were implemented during the remaining months of 2018. However, as a result of the unexpectedly slow recovery of Matratzen Concord and the ensuing financial obligations Beter Bed decided on 25 June 2019 to sell Matrazen Concord, either partially or fully. On 14 October 2019 Beter Bed announced that Hong Kong based private equity company Magical Honour Limited intended to buy the whole of Matratzen Concord for the sum of 5 million euros. At the same time Magical Honour Limited would invest in Beter Bed by acquiring 2.15 million of Beter Bed shares valuing 5 million euros. The transaction was to be completed by the end of 2019 the latest. During an extraordinary general meeting held on 26 November 2019 the shareholders approved the transaction. On 3 December 2019 Magical Honour Limited became the largest single shareholder of Beter Bed N.V.

Beter Bed's CFO Hugo van Ochtend was released of his duties on 12 December 2019. He was replaced by Gabrielle Reijnen at the time being a member of the holding's supervisory board. She resigned her position on the board with immediate effect.

On 9 July 2021 it was revealed that Beter Bed had sold all parts of its Swedish operations to Danish retailer Sengespecialisten, part of Lars Larsen Group and also owner of retailer Jysk, with effect of 30 June 2021.

== Assets ==
As of 1 January 2020, Beter Bed N.V. is the holding company of a number of retailers operating in three European countries; the number of stores totalling 161.

Company	Country	Number of stores
Beter Bed	Netherlands (83), Belgium (17)	100
BeddenReus	Netherlands	34
Sängjätten	Sweden	27
DBC (mattress wholesaler)	Netherlands, Germany, Spain, Belgium, Austria, France, Switzerland, United Kingdom, Sweden	N/A

== Results ==
In the table below some key figures from 2006 onwards are listed.

Beter Bed N.V. Annual Revenue (in million €)

Year	Revenue (in million €)	Net profit (in million €)	Stores	Employees (full-time)
2006	320.0	23.8	839	1.810
2007	351.2	27.6	960	2.075
2008	358.6	22.1	1.036	2.227
2009	361.5	23.9	1.064	2.274
2010	374.4	28.0	1.117	2.353
2011	397.0	28.0	1.187	2.451
2012	397.3	14.4	1.219	2.495
2013	357.5	8.2	1.175	2.420
2014	364.0	16.9	1.127	2.369
2015	385.4	22.6	1.159	2.513
2016	410.5	19.0	1.206	2.765
2017	416.4	9.5	1.188	2.849
2018	396.3	-23.3	1.009	2.738
2019	185.8	4.1	161	915

== Objectives ==
Whereas previously the objectives of Beter Bed N.V. were defined as aiming at fast and profitable expansion in the fragmented European bedroom furniture market whereby, on the one hand, the various subsidiaries were supposed to endeavour to become market leaders in those countries they were active, and, on the other hand, by developing own brand products which were to be sold by the company's own retail chains as well as through other distribution channels, the objectives since then have become more specific and detailed. Due to a change in market conditions the company now aims to strengthen further and increase its alleged market leadership by ensuring the highest service for customers in all the markets in which the company operates. The level of customer satisfaction serves as a benchmark. Furthermore, growth opportunities of all its retail formats are to be optimally utilised and market share increased as well as net profit regardless of market conditions. A further objective is a strong balance sheet with solvency of at least 30% and a ratio between net interest-bearing debt and earnings before interest, taxes, depreciation and amortization not exceeding two. The principle of corporate social responsibility in that Beter Bed “treat the interests of their stakeholders in a conscious and conscientious manner” as “sound entrepreneurship and respect for people and planet go together in this regard.”

== Strategy ==
Beter Bed Holding's describes its strategy for the realisation of these objectives by ensuring like for like growth in revenue at comparable-store by continually refining the positioning of its retail formats and by increasing customer satisfaction. The ultimate aim is to increase the market share in an omnichannel retail environment. The various formats face different challenges in their respective markets which are tackled individually. Product and brand innovation play a key role as well as intensifying of cooperation with strategic suppliers. Supporting this will be the marketing department whose spending will be increased. A further emphasis will be put on e-commerce activities which will be further expanded and refined in order to gain a substantial share in online revenue. Additionally, the company aims to expand in the markets where it is already a participant, particularly in the Benelux but also in Germany, Austria and Switzerland. Another emphasis is put on purchasing whose objectives include the improving of margins, developing the online range, optimising lead times, having fewer, yet more strategic, suppliers with fewer stock keeping units, developing additional ranges and creating the most possible synergies between the different formats. In order to ensure the implementation and execution of the strategy as well as delivering the defined results functions related to the back office are expected to focus on customer satisfaction and furthering professionalism and proactivity. Human resource management will play a key role in providing training opportunities, recruiting young talent and focussing on creating a customer-centred, high-performance KPI and team culture. Finance will evolve into business support function whereby the analysis capacity will be expanded by means including implementing a modern business information warehouse and applying function-specific [[dashboard {business}|dashboards]]. Logistics will focus on creating an optimal infrastructure which, for every country in Beter Bed is active in, will be optimised individually. The aim is to accelerate the supply chain. With regards to corporate social responsibility (CSR), the ambition of Beter Bed is “to further develop initiatives in the field of promoting the circular economy from within the sector and in dialogue with strategic suppliers.”

== Corporate affairs ==
=== Management board ===
The management board of Beter Bed N.V. consists of the chief executive officer and the chief financial officer.

- John Kruijssen, CEO
- Gabrielle Reijnen, CFO

=== Supervisory board ===
The supervisory board consists of five members.

- Bart Karis, chairman
- Pieter Boone, vice-chairman
- Alain Beyens
- Barbara van Hussen
- Maaike Schipperheij

== Substantial holdings ==
A total of 24.105.562 shares have been issued. As of 21 September 2020 52.7% of shares are held by seven companies. The remaining 47.3% are mostly free floating or are owned by single share holders with less than 3% of the total volume, 3% being the threshold where, according to Dutch law, shareholders have to report this to the Netherlands Authority for the Financial Markets.

Shareholder	Percentage
Belegging- en Exploitatiemaatschappij 'De Engh B.V.'	11.0%
Teslin Participaties Coöperatief U.A.	10.2%
Magical Honour Limited	8.9%
Navitas B.V.	6.7%
ASR Nederland N.V.	6.6%
Ameriprise Financial Inc	4.7%
Harris Associates L.P	4.6%
