= AScX index =

The AScX index, derived from Amsterdam Small Cap Index, also known as Small Cap index or simply Small Cap, is a stock market index composed of Dutch companies that trade on Euronext Amsterdam, formerly known as the Amsterdam Stock Exchange. The index was started in 2005. It is composed of the 25 funds that trade on the exchange and that rank 51–75 in size. The funds that rank 1–25 in size are represented in the AEX index and the funds that rank 26–50 in size are represented in the AMX index. The composition is reviewed twice a year.

== Composition ==
The AScX index has the following composition as of 14 June 2018.

Company	ICB Sector	Ticker symbol	Index weighting (%)
Accell Group	recreational products	ACCEL	4.18
Amsterdam Commodities	food products	ACOMO	4.32
Avantium	specialty chemicals	AVTX	0.77
Basic-Fit	recreational services	BFIT	7.82
Beter Bed	home improvement retailers	BBED	1.17
Binckbank	investment services	BINCK	2.66
Brunel International	support services	BRNL	3.41
Fagron	medical equipment	FAGR	5.38
ForFarmers	farming and fishing	FFARM	5.41
Heijmans	heavy construction	HEIJM	2.39
Hunter Douglas	furnishings	HDG	4.28
ICT Group	software	ICT	1.11
Kas Bank	investment services	KA	1.08
Kendrion	industrial machinery	KENDR	4.47
Kiadis	biotechnology	KDS	0.91
Lucas Bols	distillers and vintners	BOLS	1.26
Nedap	electronic equipment	NEDAP	2.08
NSI NV	diversified REITs	NSI	5.60
Ordina	computer services	ORDI	1.51
Pharming Group	biotechnology	PHARM	8.13
SIF Holding	renewable energy equipment	SIFG	1.94
Van Lanschot Kempen	banks	VLK	8.33
Vastned	retail REITs	VASTN	5.49
VolkerWessels	heavy construction	KVW	6.65
Wessanen	food products	WES	9.65

== See also ==
- AEX index, the market index of the 25 largest funds on Euronext Amsterdam.
- AMX index, the market index of the next 25 largest funds on Euronext Amsterdam.
