= AMX index =

Dutch stock market index

The AMX index, derived from Amsterdam Midkap Index, also known as Midkap index or simply Midkap, is a stock market index composed of Dutch companies that trade on Euronext Amsterdam, formerly known as the Amsterdam Stock Exchange. The index was started in 1995. It is composed of the 25 funds that trade on the exchange and that rank 26–50 in size. The funds that rank 1–25 in size are represented in the AEX index.

== Composition ==
As of June 2021 the AMX index has the following composition.

Company	ICB Sector	Ticker symbol	Index weighting (%)
Air France-KLM	airlines	AF	2.52
Advanced Metallurgical Group	machinery: Industrial	AMG	1.57
Aperam	iron and steel	APAM	4.0
Arcadis	engineering and contracting services	ARCAD	4.81
Boskalis	construction	BOKA	3.74
Corbion	food products	CRBN	5.50
Eurocommercial Properties	retail REITs	ECMPA	1.61
Flow traders	investment services	FLOW	2.44
Fugro	engineering and contracting services	FUR	1.61
GrandVision	medical supplies	GVNV	3.46
Intertrust	financial services	INTER	2.25
OCI	Fertilizers	OCI	2.92
PostNL	delivery services	PNL	3.92
SBM Offshore	oil equipment and services	SBMO	3.73
TKH Group	electrical components	TWEKA	2.81
WDP	industrial REITs	WDP	8.47
JDE Peet's	soft drinks	JDEP	4.42
Alfen	electronic equipment	ALFEN	3.14
Basic-Fit	recreational services	BFIT	2.71
Abn Amro	bank	ABN	7.86
Vopak	transportation services	VPK	4.64
Aalberts	electronic equipment	AALB	8.21
InPost	delivery services	INPST	6.52
Fagron	medical equipment	FAGR	2.37
Galapagos	biotechnology	GLPG	4.79

== See also ==
- AEX index, market index of 25 largest caps on Euronext Amsterdam.
- AScX index, market index of 25 small caps on Euronext Amsterdam.
