= Holland Life Insurance =

Former Dutch life insurance company

- Native name: Hollandsche Sociëteit van Levensverzekeringen
- Type: Society
- Industry: Insurance
- Founded: 1807
- Founder: Antoni Hartsen
- Defunct: 1967
- Fate: Merged
- Successor: Delta Lloyd
- Headquarters: Amsterdam, Netherlands
- Area served: Netherlands
- Products: Life insurance

Holland Life Insurance (Dutch: Hollandsche Sociëteit van Levensverzekeringen) was a Dutch life insurance company founded in Amsterdam in 1807 by Antoni Hartsen. It was the first life insurance company established on the European mainland. In 1967, it merged with Amstleven to form Delta, a predecessor of Delta Lloyd.

== History ==
The Hollandsche Sociëteit van Levensverzekeringen was founded on 8 September 1807 and began operations in Amsterdam on 1 October. Antoni Hartsen served as its first director, supported by a supervisory board that included Cornelis Hartsen, Jacob Fock, Abraham Johannes Severijn, and Willem Willink Jr. Before founding the company, Hartsen studied British mortality tables and life insurance practices and developed actuarial tables that became the basis of the company's premiums. The company is generally regarded as the first life insurance institution established on the European mainland. Hartsen built a network of brokers and correspondents across the Netherlands and several European cities, while maintaining centralized control over underwriting decisions. The company rejected speculative life insurance and in 1808 declined a proposal to insure the life of Napoleon. The firm remained relatively small during much of the nineteenth century, though it later introduced profit-sharing and expanded its sales organization. In 1896 it opened a branch in the Dutch East Indies, later transferring representation there to NILLMIJ.

In 1954 the company entered the Canadian market by establishing Holland Life Insurance Society Limited in Toronto. Led by Jan C. Tupker, the subsidiary was created to serve a growing Canadian market and the postwar Dutch immigrant community. Business expanded rapidly, with insurance in force rising from more than C$2 million in 1955 to approximately C$12 million by 1957. Branches were opened in Hamilton, Montreal, and Vancouver. The Canadian operation remained active until its insurance portfolio was assumed by Commercial Union Assurance Company in 1977.

== Merger and successor companies ==
After a series of acquisitions in the postwar period, Hollandsche Sociëteit merged with Amstleven in 1967 to form Delta, which became part of the Delta Lloyd Group. In 2016, NN Group acquired Delta Lloyd for €2.5 billion.
