= Omega Pharma =

Belgian pharmaceutical company

Omega Pharma N.V.
- Company type: Subsidiary company
- ISIN: BE0003785020
- Industry: Pharmaceuticals
- Founded: 1987
- Defunct: 2015
- Headquarters: Nazareth, Belgium
- Key people: Marc Coucke (Founder)
- Products: Prescription-free medicines and healthcare products
- Revenue: €1.27 billion (2014)
- Operating income: €200 million (2014)
- Net income: €69.5 million (2010)
- Total assets: €1.443 billion (end 2010)
- Total equity: €718.3 million (end 2010)
- Number of employees: 2,130 (end 2010)
- Parent: Perrigo Company plc
- Website: omega-pharma.be

Omega Pharma was a Belgian-based pharmaceutical company which was acquired in 2014 by Perrigo Company plc, an Irish/United States–based global pharmaceutical public company. The company was founded in 1987 and was based in the Industrial area 'de Prijkels' in Nazareth.

== History ==
The company was founded in 1987 by Marc Coucke and Yvan Vindevogel, both former pharmacy students at the Ghent University. They each had a 50% share in the company. Their first product was a shampoo in 5 liter bottles which they sold to pharmacists who then added a customised scent and colour to sell the product as a homemade brand. In 1989 they started selling Uvesol tanning lotions. In 1994 Yvan Vindevogel sold his shares to Marc Coucke.

in 1998 was the company's initial public offering (IPO). Omega Pharmaa was initially listed as a Naamloze vennootschap on the Euronext Brussels and used to be part of the BEL20 index until late 2011 when Coucke (through his investment company Couckinvest) and private equity firm Waterland took the company private once again. Omega Pharma was officially acquired by Perrigo with effect from 31 March 2015. The company is now part of the Branded Consumer Healthcare division within Perrigo.

Between 2012 and 2014, Omega Pharma, together with Quick Step, was a corporate sponsor of the Omega Pharma–Quick-Step UCI World Tour cycling team.

== Arseus ==
At the annual shareholders meeting of Omega Pharma held on 6 June 2006, it was announced that the company's professional health division would operate under the name of Arseus. Simultaneously, the management team of Arseus was presented. The legal structure of the entities in this division has been largely prepared in the meantime, so that the project to make Arseus an autonomous company is on schedule. Arseus became effectively an independent entity via an IPO on 5 October 2007 and has been listed on NYSE Euronext Brussels and NYSE Euronext Amsterdam since then.

== Brands ==
- Bergasol (tanning products)
- Biodermal
- Biover (natural Healthcare products: vitamines, minerals, supplements, aromatherapy)
- Bodysol (hypoallergenic bodycare)
- Bronchostop Duo (cough)
- Calmanax
- Cremicort
- Davitamon (Multi-vitamine supplements)
- Dermalex (skincare for regular skin or specific skin diseases)
- Dynarax
- Eau Précieuse
- Galenco (hypoallergenic skincare for babies and young children)
- Kaliptus
- Lactacyd (female intimate hygiene)
- Naaprep
- Opticalmax
- Paranix (anti-lice)
- Physiomer (Nasal sprays made of purified seawater)
- Phytosun (Aromatherapy and essential oil)
- Predictor (pregnancy test)
- Prevalin
- T. LeClerc (cosmetics)
- Vitafytea (fytotherapy)
- XL-S Medical (weightloss)
- XLS Cure (weightloss)
- Wartner (warts removal at home)
- Ymea (reduces symptoms of the menopause)
- Yokebe (diet protein shakes)
- Zaffranax (uplifting supplement treatment for depressed people)
- Zaffranpure
- Zincotabs (zinc)
