= NN Investment Partners =

Dutch Asset Management Firm

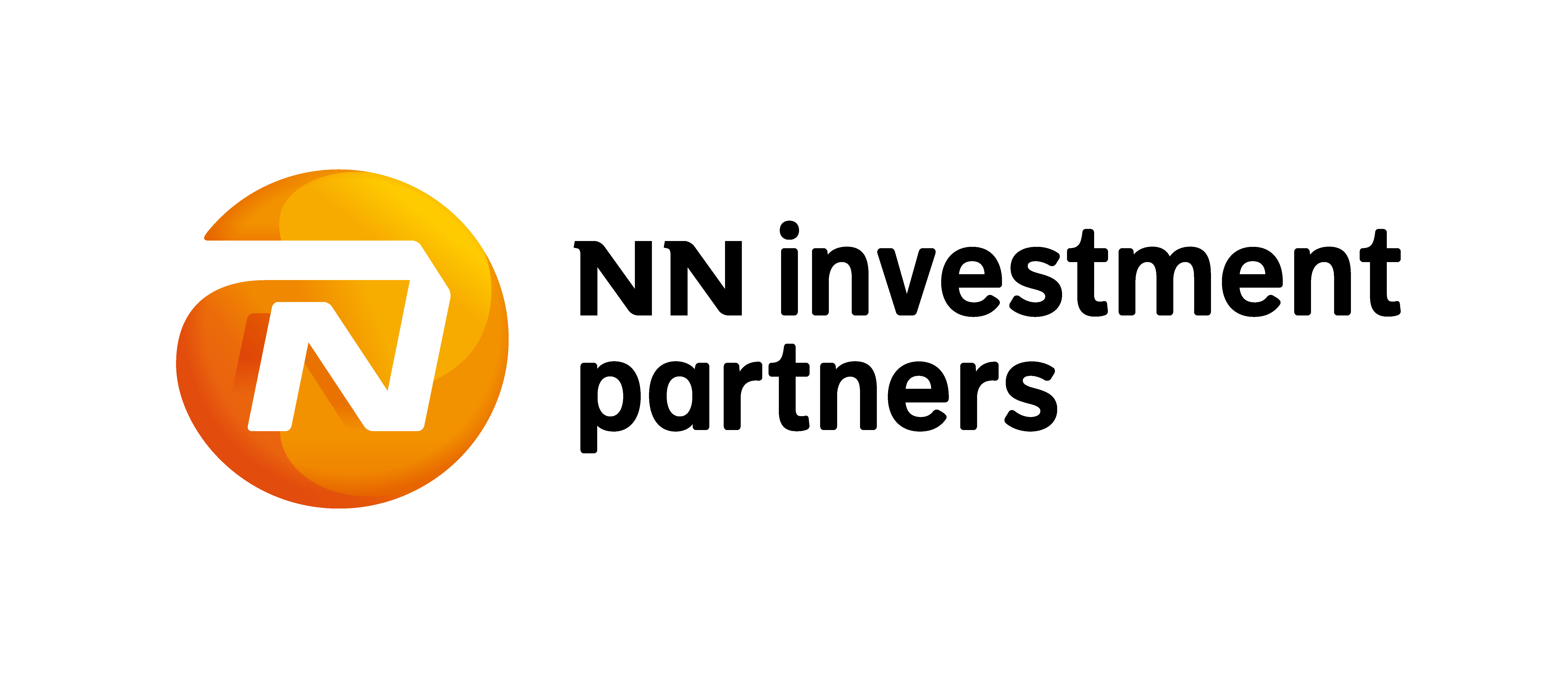

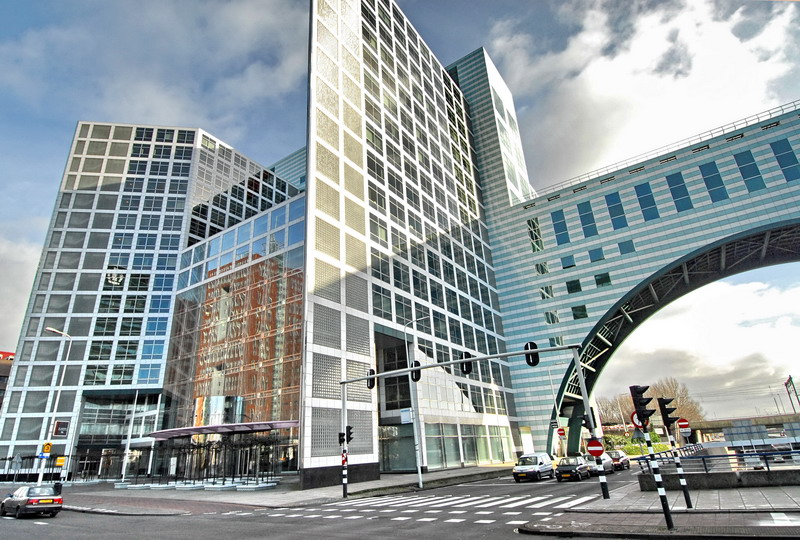
- Haagse Poort in The Hague
- Type: Division
- Industry: Asset Management
- Founded: 1994
- Headquarters: The Hague, Netherlands
- Key people: Co-Chief Executive Officer: Martijn Canisius and Gerald Cartigny. CIO: Valentijn van Nieuwenhuijzen
- Parent: Goldman Sachs
- Website: nnip.com

NN Investment Partners (also known as NN IP) was a Netherlands-based asset manager, with headquarters in The Hague and offices in 15 countries in Europe, Asia and the Americas. The company was acquired by Goldman Sachs Asset Management, the asset management division of Goldman Sachs in April 2022.

NN IP was an active manager for institutional and wholesale investors around the world. It managed €287 billion in assets for clients, integrating Environmental, social and corporate governance (ESG) criteria throughout the investment process for the majority of its strategies. NN IP was globally ranked as the 87th biggest asset management firm and the third biggest Dutch asset manager. NN IP offered its services to pension funds, insurers, family offices, independent financial advisers, banks and private individuals; in addition to managing the assets of the NN Group.

On the 19th of August 2021 NN announced an agreement to sell its asset manager NN Investment Partners (NN IP) to Goldman Sachs Group, Inc. which was completed in 2022.

== History ==
The company was created under the name of ING Investment Management in 1994, when parent company NN Group was part of bank and insurance company ING Group. In the aftermath of the 2008 financial crisis, ING was required to divest its insurance activities and the asset management division. NN Group, the combination of the two businesses, was listed on Euronext Amsterdam in 2014. The following year, ING Investment Management was rebranded as NN Investment Partners.

In 2022 Goldman Sachs Group, Inc acquired NN Investment Partners from NN Group N.V. for €1.7 billion.

On 6 March 2023, the legal entity NN Investment Partners B.V. ceased to exist and was incorporated into Goldman Sachs Asset Management.

== Responsible Investment Policy ==
In 2019, NN IP published its first Responsible Investing Report, in which it provides insights into how it integrates environmental, social and governance (ESG) criteria into its investment processes. According to the report a set of ESG criteria is applied to 67% of its total assets under management.

NN IP generally pursues active engagement with potentially controversial companies to help them improve their ESG profiles. One example cited by NN IP is the palm oil industry. Engagements with several large plantation companies have resulted in progress on encouraging them to pursue a more sustainable policy. In 2019, NN IP became a member of the Roundtable on Sustainable Palm Oil (RSPO).

In a limited number of cases, the company has divested it holdings in sectors deemed detrimental to society and/or the planet. Excluded business activities include adult entertainment, arctic drilling, fur & specialty leather, gambling, nuclear energy, shale oil & gas and weapons.

== Assets under management ==
- EUR 287 billion (as of 30 September 2019)
- ESG (Environmental, social and corporate governance) criteria are integrated throughout the investment process for EUR 176 billion of assets under management (AuM)
- Sustainable strategies: AuM EUR 17.4 billion
- Impact strategies (with positive contribution to the UN Sustainable Development Goals): AuM EUR 1.9 billion
