= BOCM Pauls =

British livestock feed company (1992–2014)

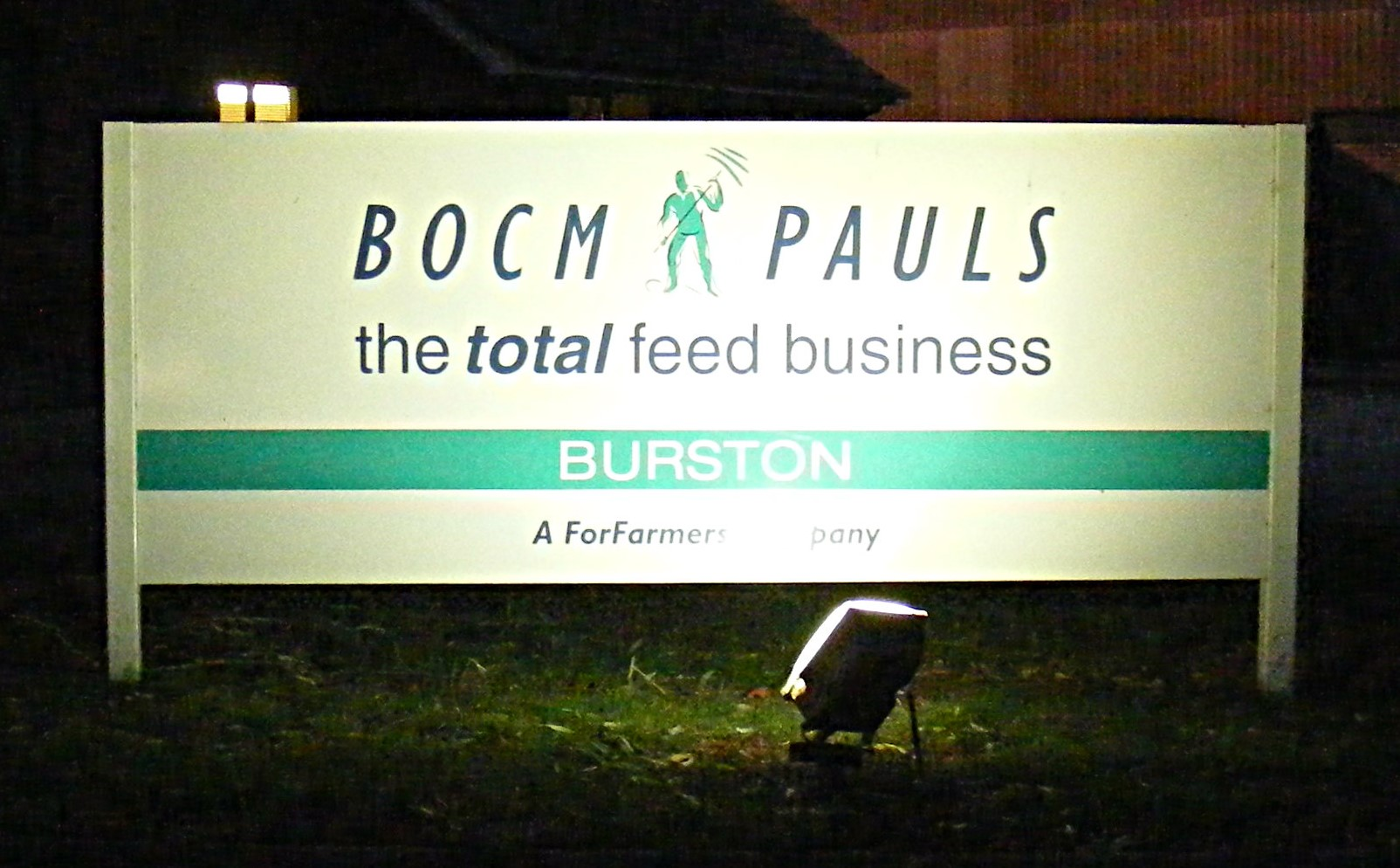
- Type: Manufacturer
- Industry: animal feeds
- Founded: 1992
- Successor: ForFarmers (2012)
- Headquarters: Ipswich, United Kingdom
- Area served: United Kingdom
- Products: livestock food
- Website: www.forfarmers.co.uk

BOCM Pauls Limited was a British animal feed company, established in 1992 by the amalgamation of two existing businesses.

BOCM Pauls manufactured and sold animal feed in the United Kingdom and abroad. It offered feed for farm animals, pets and game birds. The company also offered beef compounds, dry feeds, moist feeds, minerals, organic products, together with forage products, such as fertilizers, grass seeds, maize seeds, and silage additives. It sold its products through a network of distributors around Europe.

== History ==
Pauls Agriculture was founded in Ipswich in the early 19th century, initially to trade in malt and barley for the brewing industry. This expanded into the trading of maize and other foods for horses. From the early 1900s, they started to produce food for other animals too.

BOCM Silcock, originally British Oil and Cake Mills Ltd. also started in the 19th century and was one of the earliest crushers of oilseeds to produce vegetable oils for human consumption and the manufacturing of soap. The by-product of this process, the oilseed cake, was a good source of protein for animal feed.

Pauls Agriculture and BOCM Silcock merged in 1992 to form BOCM Pauls. The company manufactured and sold animal feed in the United Kingdom and abroad. It offered feed for farm animals, pets and game birds. The company also offered beef compounds, dry feeds, moist feeds, minerals, organic products, together with forage products, such as fertilizers, grass seeds, maize seeds, and silage additives. It sold its products through a network of distributors around Europe.

BOCM Pauls was purchased by ForFarmers for €85 million in 2012 and the BOCM Pauls brand was retired in 2014.
