= Delta Lloyd Group =

Dutch insurance company

Delta Lloyd N.V.
- Type: Naamloze vennootschap
- Industry: Financial services
- Predecessor: Nederlandsche Lloyd
- Founded: 1807; 219 years ago
- Headquarters: Amsterdam, Netherlands
- Key people: Hans van der Noordaa (CEO), Rob Ruijter (chairman of the supervisory board)
- Products: Life, property and casualty insurance; mortgages; asset management; savings accounts
- Revenue: €8.999 billion (2010)
- Net income: €620.8 million (2010)
- Total assets: $108.1 billion (2015)
- Total equity: €4.956 billion (end 2010)
- Number of employees: 6,665 (FTE, average 2010)
- Website: www.deltalloydgroep.com/en/

Delta Lloyd Group was a Dutch insurer with operations in the Netherlands, Belgium and Germany. It consisted of Delta Lloyd, OHRA, ABN AMRO Verzekeringen and a few minor banks. The company was the sixth-largest insurer in the Netherlands, with a market share of approximately 8% before it was acquired by NN Group in 2017.

Up until the merger, Delta Lloyd was owned by the Dutch foundation Nuts OHRA (5%) and publicly traded (95%). Previously, it had been owned by Aviva. On 23 December 2016, competitor NN Group reached an agreement to acquire Delta Lloyd for 2.5 billion euro.

== History ==
=== Early history ===
The earliest predecessor of Delta Lloyd, the Hollandsche Societeit van Levensverzekeringen, was founded in 1807. In 1966, it merged with the Amsterdamsche Maatschappij van Levensverzekeringen- also known as Amstleven and was renamed Delta. The "Hollandsche Societeit" had a few non life companies, like the "Koepel" and "Bataafsche", while Amstleven had acquired the Arnhemsche Verzekering maatschappij N.V. in 1964. Daughter of the Arnhemsche was the specialist pleasurecraft insurer "Nereus. Before the "Delta" group could consolidate properly in 1967, Delta merged with NedLloyd (not to be confused with the shipping company of the same name). As all offices of the various companies were spread around Amsterdam- CBD - within the canal belt - it was decided to build a new head office in Amsterdam Slotervaart at the Nachtwachtlaan. All non life business moved there in 1969. In 1973, all shares in Delta were bought by the British firm Commercial Union (now part of Aviva). In 1999, Delta Lloyd merged with OHRA, the resulting company being renamed to Delta Lloyd Group in 2002.

=== Initial public offering ===
The Delta Lloyd Group officially went public on the NYSE Euronext Amsterdam on 3 November 2009. Delta Lloyd made 38–42% of its shares public, with its major shareholder Aviva reducing its ownership from 92% to 50–54%. Delta Lloyd's other previous shareholder, Nuts OHRA, retained its 8% stake. In July 2012 and January 2013, Aviva sold its stake, making the group 95% publicly traded.

=== Acquisition by NN Group ===
On 5 October 2016 NN Group unexpectedly made an offer for all Delta Lloyd shares; the offer had a cash value of 2.4 billion euros. Delta Lloyd, the fourth-largest insurer in the Netherlands, had 3.2 million customers in the Netherlands and Belgium and 5,200 employees. NN Group was much larger than Delta Lloyd; it had four times as many customers and double the number of employees. In December 2016, the two reached an agreement after NN Group raised the bid by 10 euro cents to €5.40 per share. The combination would become a strong player in pensions, non-life insurance and asset management in the Netherlands and Belgium. Furthermore, it would be able to work more efficiently, achieving significant cost benefits of at least €150 million by 2020. Trade union CNV Vakmensen feared that between 1,000 and 1,500 jobs will be lost in the process. On 1 June 2017 Delta Lloyd ceased to exist for good. The legal merger with NN Group took effect on that day. Delta Lloyd shareholders received NN Group shares. On May 31, Delta Lloyd shares traded for the last time and the company disappeared from the stock exchange.

== Delta Lloyd Netherlands ==
=== Delta Lloyd ===
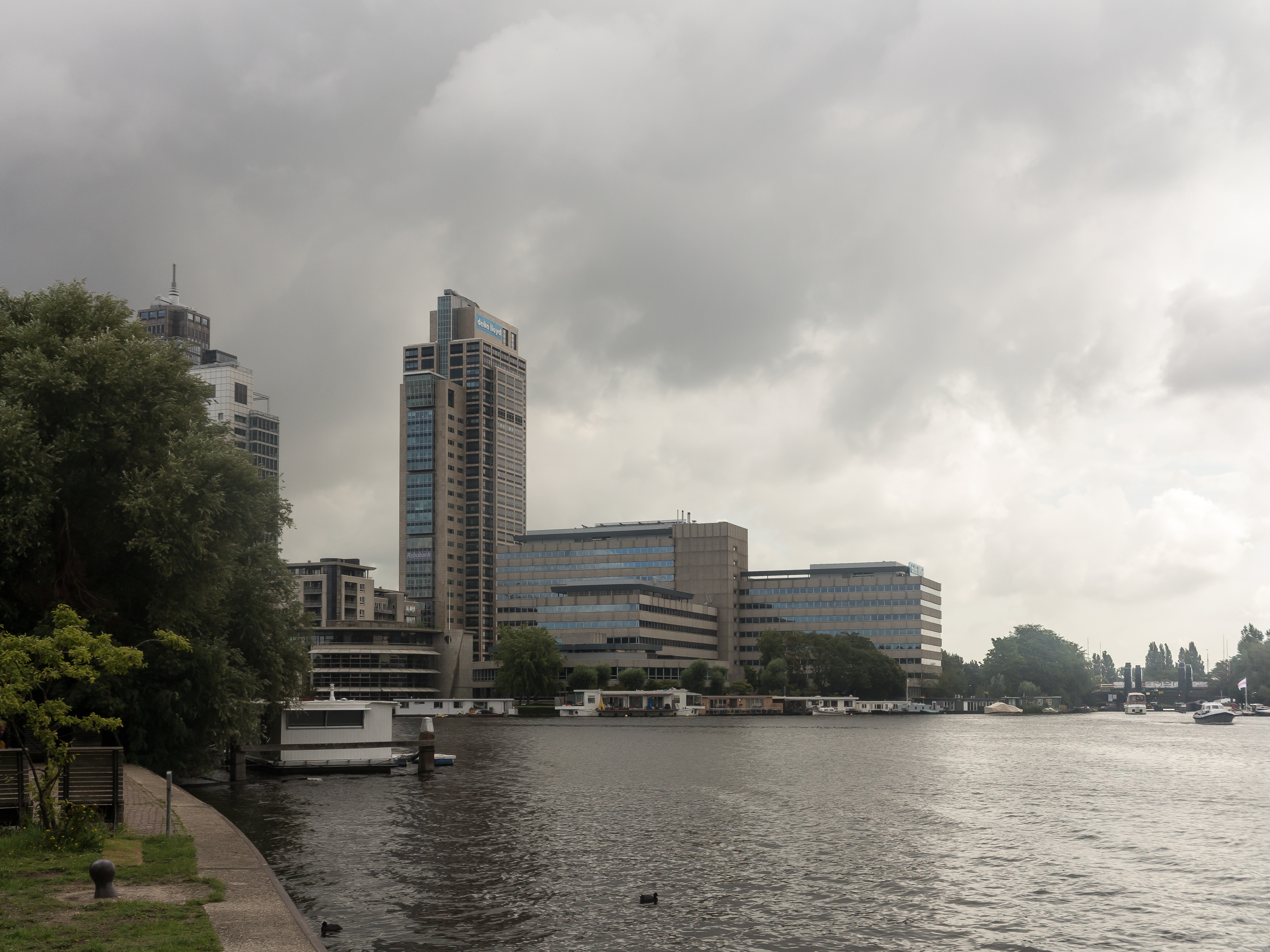
Amsterdam, office building: Delta Lloyd

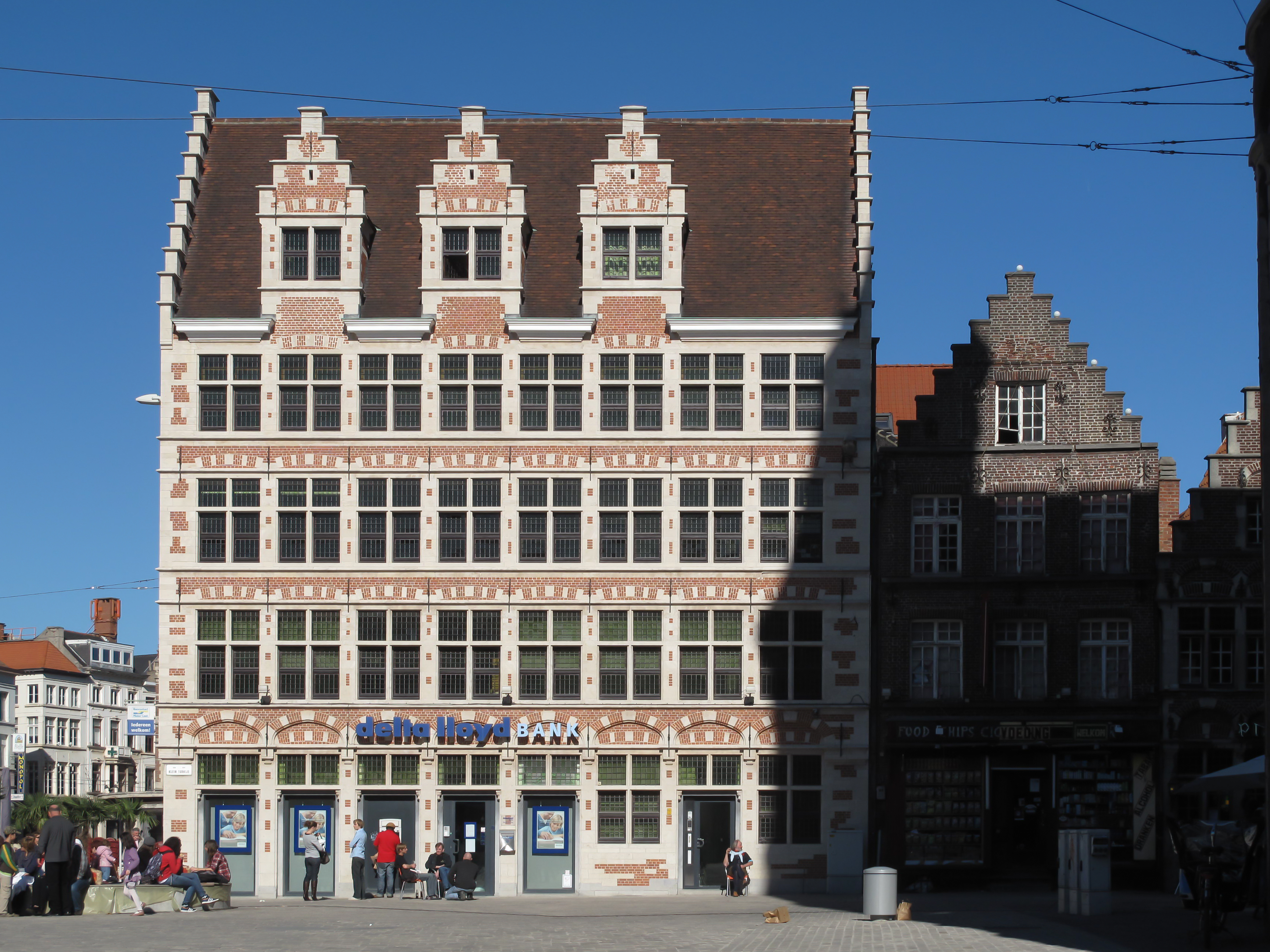
Ghent, office building: Delta Lloyd

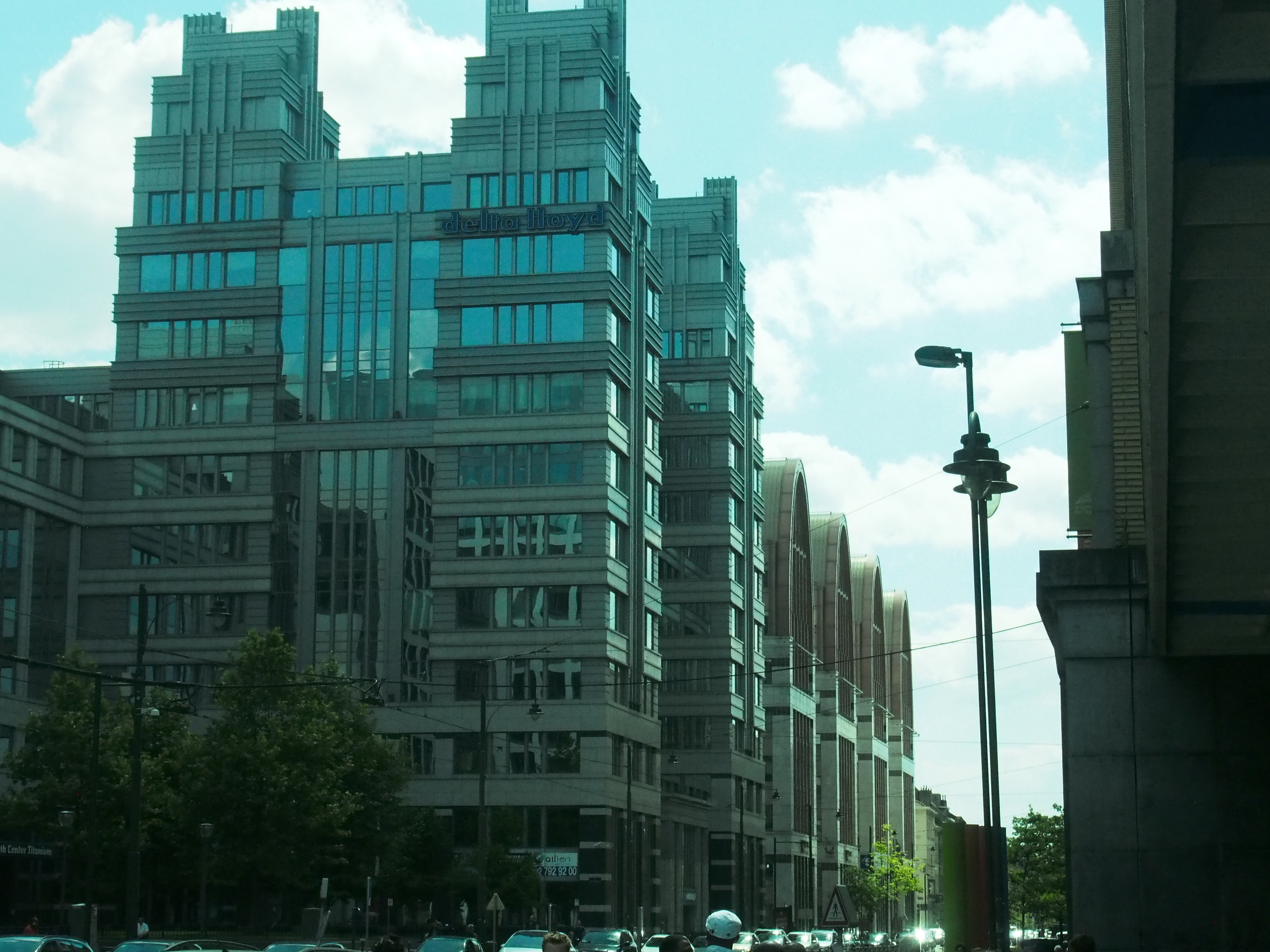
Office building in Brussels

Delta Lloyd formed the core of the Delta Lloyd Group. It offered savings accounts, insurance and financial planning.

=== OHRA ===
OHRA was formed in 1925 and originally known as Onderlinge ziektekostenverzekeringsfonds van Hoogere RijksAmbtenaren (Mutual health insurance for senior civil servants).

=== ABN AMRO Verzekeringen ===
ABN AMRO Verzekeringen is a joint venture between ABN AMRO and Delta Lloyd, giving Delta Lloyd the exclusive right to sell insurance through ABN AMRO offices.

=== Delta Lloyd Health Insurance ===
Delta Lloyd was only a small player in the health insurance market. Delta Lloyd to sell its health insurance division to CZ Group, effective 1 January 2008.

=== Delta Lloyd Bank ===
Delta Lloyd also offered limited banking products, such as savings accounts and mortgages.
