= Aalberts =

Dutch company

Aalberts N.V.
- Type: Naamloze vennootschap
- Traded as: Euronext: AALB
- Industry: Manufacturing, engineering
- Founded: 1975
- Headquarters: Utrecht, Netherlands
- Key people: Stéphane Simonetta (CEO); Frans den Houter (CFO)
- Revenue: € 3,091 million (end 2025)
- Net income: €149.0 million (end 2025)
- Total assets: €4,325 million (end 2025)
- Total equity: €2,427 million (end 2025)
- Number of employees: 12,943 (end 2025)
- Website: www.aalberts.com

Aalberts N.V. is a Dutch company founded by Jan Aalberts in 1975. It became public in 1987 and is currently listed in the AEX index.

Aalberts engineers mission-critical technologies, has over 12,900 employees, 127 locations with activities in over 50 countries and operates technology clusters in three end markets: building, semicon and industry.

== History ==
In 2006, Aalberts was fined over €100 million by the European Commission for allegedly being part of a cartel for copper fittings. Aalberts appealed the decision and in 2011 the European Court of Justice acquitted Aalberts. However, the European Commission appealed that ruling. In July 2013, the Court finally acquitted Aalberts on appeal. The company has always denied involvement in the cartel and never made any provision for the fine.

In May 2018, Aalberts acquired PEM, a company specialized in the electrolytic protection of metals, located in Siaugues-Sainte-Marie.

Turnover in the year 2025 was €3.1 B euro.

== Shareholders ==
Biggest stock shareholders are family companies of Aalberts, FMR, Capital Group, Invesco, BlackRock, Impax Asset Management, BNP Paribas Asset Management, New Perspective Fund.

== Mergers & Acquisitions ==
- Hage Fittings & Flanschen GmbH (2003) Stainless Steel Pressfittings Starpress & GRPESS and Valve Manufacturer
- H&ST Heat & Surface (2002)
- Metalis and Methatherm (2002)
- Durotec (2002) Fluid Control Distributor
- Machinefabriek Van Andel (2002)
- Härterei Hauck Rhein-Main GmbH (2002) increased stake 60% to 90%
- Acorn (2002) Surface Treatment
- Standard Hidráulica S.A. (2001) Flow Control Manufacturer
- Meibes Zeitspar-Armaturen (2001) Stainless Steel Valves
- PBC Dopheide (2001) Industrial Coating
- AHC Group (2001) Industrial Coatings
- Van Roij Engineering (2000) Steel Distributor
- Stork TPP (2000) High-Precision Componentry
- Tratmar (2000)
- Thermi (2000) Heat Treatment and Coating Center
