= MotorK =

- Traded as: Euronext Amsterdam: MTRK
- Industry: automotive
- Founders: Marco Marlia, CEO - Fabio Gurgone, CTO - Marco De Michele, VP Business Enablement
- Headquarters: Milan
- Key people: Amir Rosentuler, Chairman - Johnny Quach, CPO/CMO - Yair Pinyan, CRDO - Status is reachable Zoltan Gelencser, CFO,
- Website: www.motork.io

MotorK is an AI-centric SaaS vendor working in the automotive retail sector in the Europe region. It is based in Milan, Italy and publicly traded on the Euronext Amsterdam.

== History ==
The company was founded as Drivek in Milan, Italy in 2010 as a car comparison website.

In 2016, it raised the venture capital with €9 million in equity funding. In 2018, the company got €15 million from the European Investment Bank.

In 2017, it launched in Spain, and the following year in UK and Germany. In 2019 Motork expanded to France. In 2020, Motork raised additional €10 million and in 2021, it was listed on Euronext Amsterdam having raised €75 million during its IPO. The capitalization reached €251 million.

In 2021, Motork established a second R&D center in Portugal and a technology hub in Israel. During the same year, the company acquired Spanish Dapda S.L and French Fidcar.

In 2022, MotorK acquired German software provider WebMobil24 and European automotive retail solutions provider Carflow.

In 2023, MotorK acquired automotive retail solutions provider GestionaleAuto.com.

=== Review ===
In 2022, the French financial newspaper La Tribune in its annual report stated that MotorK accelerates auto trade digitalization.
