= Fagron =

Multinational group of companies

Fagron NV
- Company type: Public company
- Traded as: Euronext Brussels: FAGR
- Industry: Healthcare services and products
- Predecessor: Omega Pharma (Professional health division)
- Headquarters: Rotterdam, Netherlands
- Area served: Europe, South America and the United States
- Number of employees: over 2,000
- Website: fagron.com/en

Fagron NV is a publicly traded multinational group of companies governed by Belgian law. Its registered office is located in Waregem, Belgium, and its headquarters is located at Rotterdam, Netherlands. Founded as Arseus NV, it was formerly the Professional Health Division of Omega Pharma, and became an independent entity via an IPO on October 5, 2007 and has been listed on Euronext Brussels and Euronext Amsterdam since then. Its share is included in the BEL MID-index and the Amsterdam Small Cap Index (AScX). The head office of Fagron is located in Rotterdam (the Netherlands).

== Overview ==
Fagron supplies products and services to professionals and institutions in the healthcare sector in Europe, the United States, Brazil and Argentina. The company comprises four company divisions:

- Fagron Group supplies products for pharmaceutical drug compounding to hospitals and pharmacists. This division also sells products under the Fagron brand name.

Fagron was founded in Rotterdam (the Netherlands) in 1990 by Ger van Jeveren. Rafael Padila is the current CEO of the Fagron Group. Fagron is currently active in 29 countries in Europe, Africa, the Americas, Asia and the Pacific. Fagron products are sold to 150,000 customers in over 55 countries around the world. With 1,500 employees, Fagron generated a turnover of US$400 million in 2012.

Pharmaceutical compounding - the creation and dispensing of tailor-made medications - is the root of the pharmacy profession, often symbolised by the mortar and pestle. Compounding allows the pharmacist to work with the patient and the prescriber to customise medication to meet the patient’s specific needs. It regularly happens, for example, that patients need their medication in a dosage form or strength that is not available or that patients are allergic to an ingredient. In such situations, pharmaceutical compounding provides a tailor-made solution for the patient.

- Arseus Dental supplies dental products such as cameras and dental x-rays to dentists and dental laboratories in Belgium, the Netherlands, France, Germany and Switzerland.
- Arseus Medical supplies medical and surgical products to specialists, elderly homes, homecare nurses and hospitals in Belgium and the Netherlands.
- Corilus supplies software applications for the management of medical records, medical tests and other aspects of information technology used in healthcare, for medical specialists in Belgium, the Netherlands and France.

== History ==
Omega Pharma has been taking over smaller companies for a long time and has also set up several specialized divisions. This was part of the company's buy-and-build strategy. An important takeover was that of the Dutch company Fagron (van Ger van Jeveren) in 2000. Fagron was founded in 1990 by Ger van Jeveren and distributed raw materials for medicines. Arseus was founded in 2006 as an umbrella organization for 35 small companies (the first available annual report dates from 2007). Arseus formed the integration of the "professional healthcare division" (B2B) of Omega Pharma. Arseus went public in 2007 after a management buy-out. Omega Pharma then still retained 24% of the shares of Arseus.

In November 2009, Omega Pharma sold its stake in Arseus to the private equity investor Waterland. Through Couckinvest, Marc Coucke retained 11% of the shares. In 2014, Coucke sold additional shares, reducing his stake in Arseus to between 8% and 9%.

In 2012, Arseus restructured its divisional organization. Arseus Dental and Arseus Medical were discontinued and replaced by Healthcare Solutions and Healthcare Specialities. Healthcare Solutions consolidated the dental and medical distribution activities, while Healthcare Specialities brought together the companies developing and marketing new dental and medical products. Fagron and Corilus continued to operate as before.

In 2014, the majority of Healthcare Solutions and Healthcare Specialities was sold. These divisions had been underperforming for some time. Arseus continued with its existing units, Fagron and Corilus, and added a new division, HL Technology, which included activities related to the development and production of equipment for the dental and orthopedic industries. This was the smallest business unit within Arseus, accounting for only 3% of revenue in 2013.
