= Hexachaeta bondari =

Scientific classification
- Kingdom: Animalia
- Phylum: Arthropoda
- Class: Insecta
- Order: Diptera
- Family: Tephritidae
- Genus: Hexachaeta
- Species: H. bondari

Binomial name
- Hexachaeta bondari Lima & Leite, 1952

Species of fly

Hexachaeta bondari is a species of tephritid or fruit flies in the genus Hexachaeta of the family Tephritidae.

It is found in Bahia, Brazil.
