= Hexachaeta amabilis =

Scientific classification
- Domain: Eukaryota
- Kingdom: Animalia
- Phylum: Arthropoda
- Class: Insecta
- Order: Diptera
- Family: Tephritidae
- Genus: Hexachaeta
- Species: H. amabilis

Binomial name
- Hexachaeta amabilis (Loew, 1873)

Synonyms
- Trypeta amabilis Loew, 1873

Species of fly

Hexachaeta amabilis is a species of tephritid or fruit flies in the genus Hexachaeta of the family Tephritidae.
