= Hexachaeta isshikii =

Scientific classification
- Kingdom: Animalia
- Phylum: Arthropoda
- Clade: Pancrustacea
- Class: Insecta
- Order: Diptera
- Family: Tephritidae
- Genus: Hexachaeta
- Species: H. isshikii

Binomial name
- Hexachaeta isshikii Matsumar, 1916

Species of fly

Hexachaeta isshikii is a species of tephritid or fruit flies in the genus Hexachaeta of the family Tephritidae.
