= Hexachaeta colombiana =

Scientific classification
- Kingdom: Animalia
- Phylum: Arthropoda
- Class: Insecta
- Order: Diptera
- Family: Tephritidae
- Genus: Hexachaeta
- Species: H. colombiana

Binomial name
- Hexachaeta colombiana Lima, 1953

Species of fly

Hexachaeta colombiana is a species of tephritid or fruit fly in the genus Hexachaeta of the family Tephritidae.
