= NN Group =

Dutch insurance and asset management company

NN Group N.V.
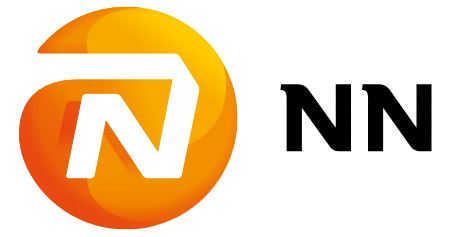

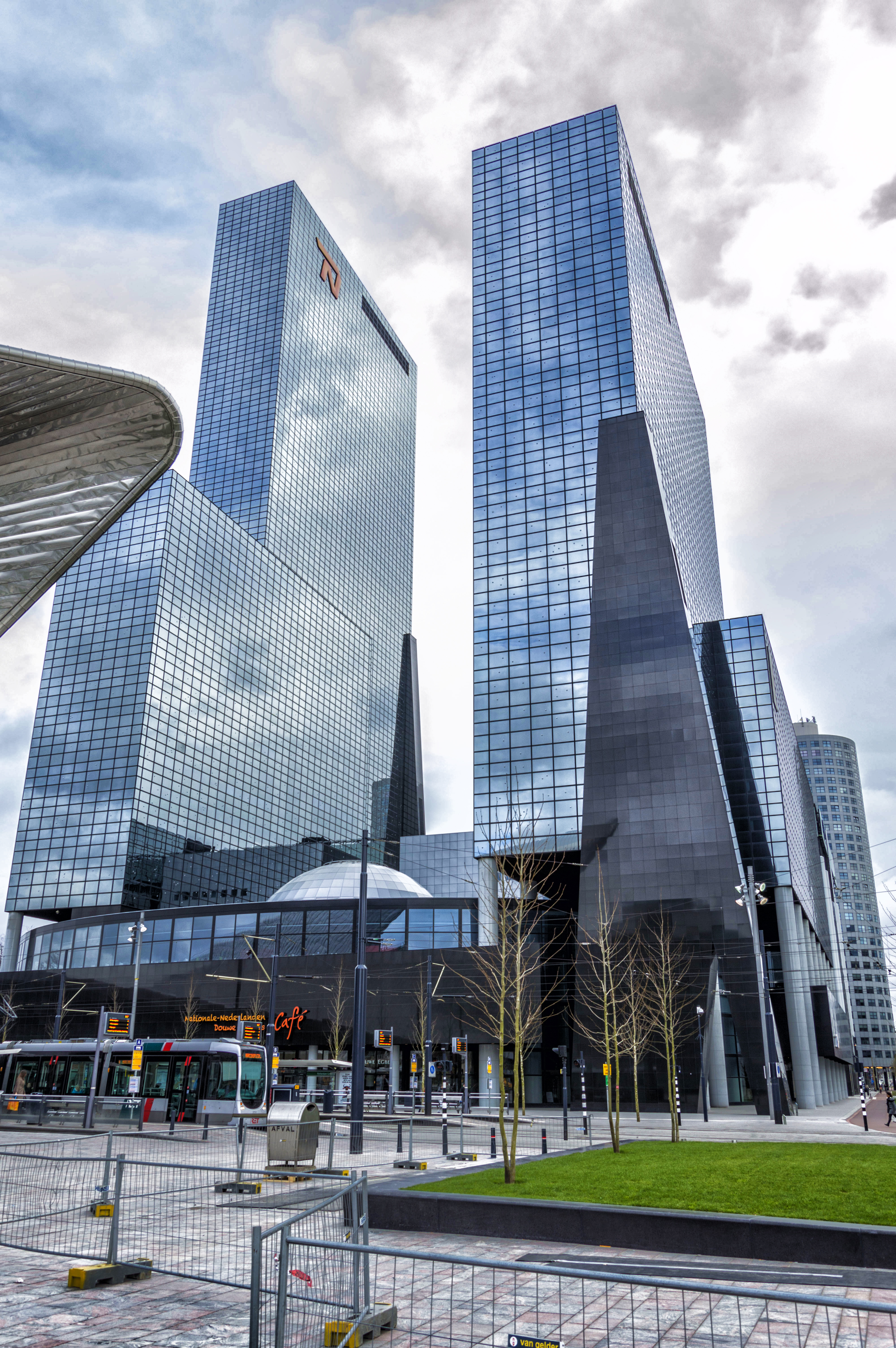
- Delftse Poort in Rotterdam
- Type: Public
- Traded as: Euronext Amsterdam: NN; AEX component
- Industry: Insurance, Asset Management, Banking
- Founded: 1963; 63 years ago
- Headquarters: The Hague, Netherlands,
- Key people: David Knibbe (CEO); Delfin Rueda (CFO)
- Products: Asset management, Life insurance Property insurance Casualty insurance Mortgages
- Revenue: €5.6 billion
- Net income: €1.4 billion
- Website: www.nn-group.com www.nn.nl

NN Group N.V. is the parent company of NN Investment Partners and Nationale-Nederlanden (Dutch pronunciation: [nɑ(t)ɕoːˌnaːlə ˈneːdərlɑndə(n)]). Nationale-Nederlanden is one of the largest insurance and asset management companies in the Netherlands. NN Group is headquartered in The Hague, its office in Rotterdam is located in the skyscraper Gebouw Delftse Poort, which was the tallest skyscraper in the Netherlands until 2009. Aside from these two offices, the company has an office in Ede (former RVS) but no other main offices in the Netherlands, instead NN mainly relies on independent intermediaries for selling insurance.

On 23 December 2016, NN Group reached an agreement to acquire competitor Delta Lloyd Group for 2.5 billion euro. NN has completed the sale of NN Investment Partners to Goldman Sachs for around EUR 1.7 billion in April 2022.

== History ==
Logo used before 2015

Nationale-Nederlanden was formed in a merger in 1963 between the De Nederlanden van 1845 (The Netherlands of 1845) and the Nationale Levensverzekeringsbank (National Life Insurance Bank). The result of the merger, because of the strong domestic position of Nationale and the international experience of De Nederlanden, was to set the company up for the future. Emerging computerisation was embraced, and other innovation costs were jointly borne by the combined companies. Cooperation strengthened the companies’ experience in group insurance and allowed Nationale-Nederlanden to expand its territory. In 1991 NN merged, this time, with the NMB Postbank Groep, to form the ING Group. Aside from insurance and asset management, the company also offers some banking products such as mortgages.

=== NN Group ===
During the 2008 financial crisis, ING Group received financial support from the Dutch State. As part of the support deal, ING Group was mandated to split off ING Direct USA and all insurance and asset management activities. In 2013, a new company, NN Group, was formed, which became the parent of the European and Japan insurance and asset management activities of ING Group, for example including Nationale-Nederlanden and NN Investment Partners. In 2014, NN Group was listed on the Euronext Amsterdam stock exchange in an IPO. The split from ING Group was finished in 2016, when it sold all remaining stock in NN Group.

== Criticism ==
In June 2018, the NN Group was criticized by environmental organizations for its investments in tar sands' oil companies and pipelines. NN Group reacted by stating that active engagement with the companies delivers more result than divestment from these companies.

== See also ==
- ING Group
- NN Penzijní společnost
