= NN Penzijní společnost =

NN Penzijní společnost, a.s.
- Founded: March 15, 1994
- Headquarters: Prague, Czech Republic
- AUM: ▲CZK 49 bn (2023)
- Total assets: ▼CZK 0.8 bn (2023)
- Owner: Nationale-Nederlanden
- Number of employees: ▲9 (2023)
- Parent: NN Continental Europe Holdings B.V.

NN Penzijní společnost, a.s. is one of the eight Czech pension companies licensed to manage state-sponsored pension funds. The company was incorporated as Průmyslový penzijní fond (Industrial pension fund) in 1994. A few years later ING Group became the sole shareholder, and in 2000 the company was renamed to ING penzijní fond (ING pension fund). In 2004 administrative expenses rose sharply, marketing expenses and personnel expenses were doubled. Company's market share subsequently deteriorated from 12% at the end of 2004 to 8% at the end of September 2014.
