= Hexachaeta homalura =

Scientific classification
- Kingdom: Animalia
- Phylum: Arthropoda
- Class: Insecta
- Order: Diptera
- Family: Tephritidae
- Genus: Hexachaeta
- Species: H. homalura

Binomial name
- Hexachaeta homalura Hendel, 1914

Species of fly

Hexachaeta homalura is a species of tephritid or fruit flies in the genus Hexachaeta of the family Tephritidae.
