= Hexachaeta =

Scientific classification
- Domain: Eukaryota
- Kingdom: Animalia
- Phylum: Arthropoda
- Class: Insecta
- Order: Diptera
- Family: Tephritidae
- Subfamily: Trypetinae
- Tribe: Toxotrypanini
- Genus: Hexachaeta; Loew, 1873

Genus of flies

Hexachaeta is a genus of tephritid or fruit flies in the family Tephritidae.

Species in Hexachaeta include:

- Hexachaeta aex Walker, 1849
- Hexachaeta abscura
- Hexachaeta amabilis
- Hexachaeta bifurcata
- Hexachaeta bondari
- Hexachaeta colombiana
- Hexachaeta cronia
- Hexachaeta dinia
- Hexachaeta ecuatoriana
- Hexachaeta enderleini
- Hexachaeta eximia
- Hexachaeta fallax
- Hexachaeta guatemalensis
- Hexachaeta homalura
- Hexachaeta isshikii
- Hexachaeta itatiaiensis
- Hexachaeta leptofasciata
- Hexachaeta major
- Hexachaeta monoctigma
- Hexachaeta monostigma
- Hexachaeta nigripes
- Hexachaeta nigriventris
- Hexachaeta oblita
- Hexachaeta obscura
- Hexachaeta parva
- Hexachaeta pulchella
- Hexachaeta rupta
- Hexachaeta seabrai
- Hexachaeta shannoni
- Hexachaeta spitzi
- Hexachaeta valida
- Hexachaeta venezuelana
- Hexachaeta zeteki
