= ForFarmers =

Dutch agricultural supplies company

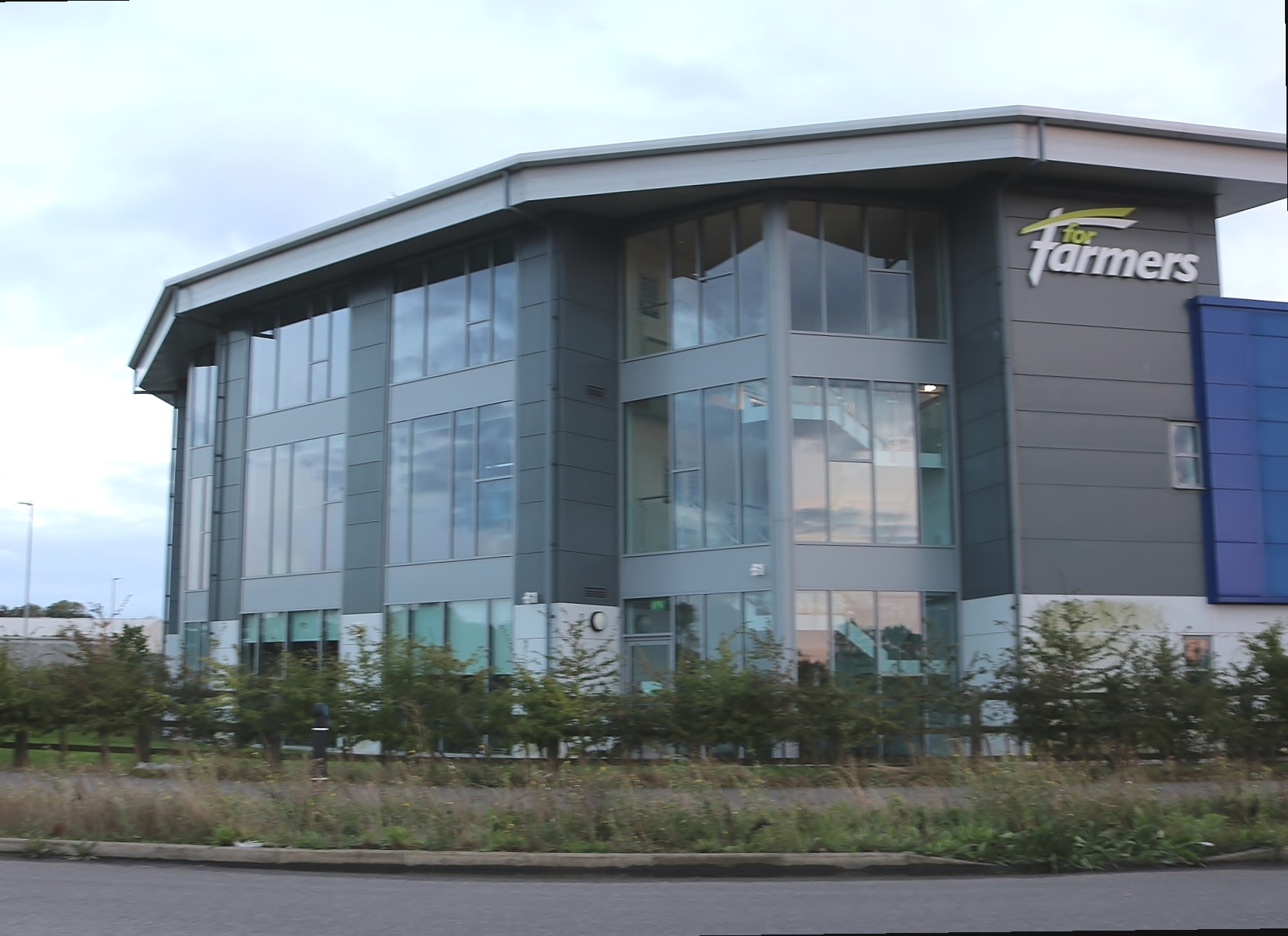
Premises in Suffolk, UK in 2023

ForFarmers is a Dutch agricultural supply company based in Lochem, Netherlands. The company was established as an agricultural cooperative in 1896 before demutualising and becoming listed on the Amsterdam Stock Exchange.

In 2022 the company announced plans to transfer some of its UK operations to a joint venture with the Boparan family, before switching plans to selling them outright.
