= Marc Coucke =

Belgian businessman, billionaire and media figure

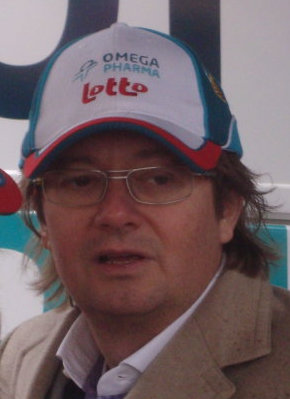
- Marck Coucke sponsoring Omega Pharma–Lotto in February 2010
- Born: Marck Coucke; 27 January 1965 (age 61); Ghent, Belgium
- Education: pharmacology at University of Ghent, General Management at Vlerick Leuven Gent Management School
- Occupations: Founder of Omega Pharma; Owner of Alychlo and RSC Anderlecht

Marc Coucke (born 27 January 1965) is a Belgian businessman, billionaire and media figure. Founder of former BEL20 pharmaceutical company Omega Pharma, he has spread his business interests across several sectors including art, through his company Kamacoucka, and sports, through the co-ownership and sponsorship of the UCI ProTeam Soudal–Quick-Step cycling team, sponsorship of French Ligue 1 side Lille OSC and as major share holder of Belgian Pro League team Anderlecht.

== Education ==
Coucke studied at St Barbara College in Ghent before attending the University of Ghent (Ghent, Belgium) where he studied pharmacy. Later he obtained a Master in General Management from the Vlerick Leuven Gent Management School.

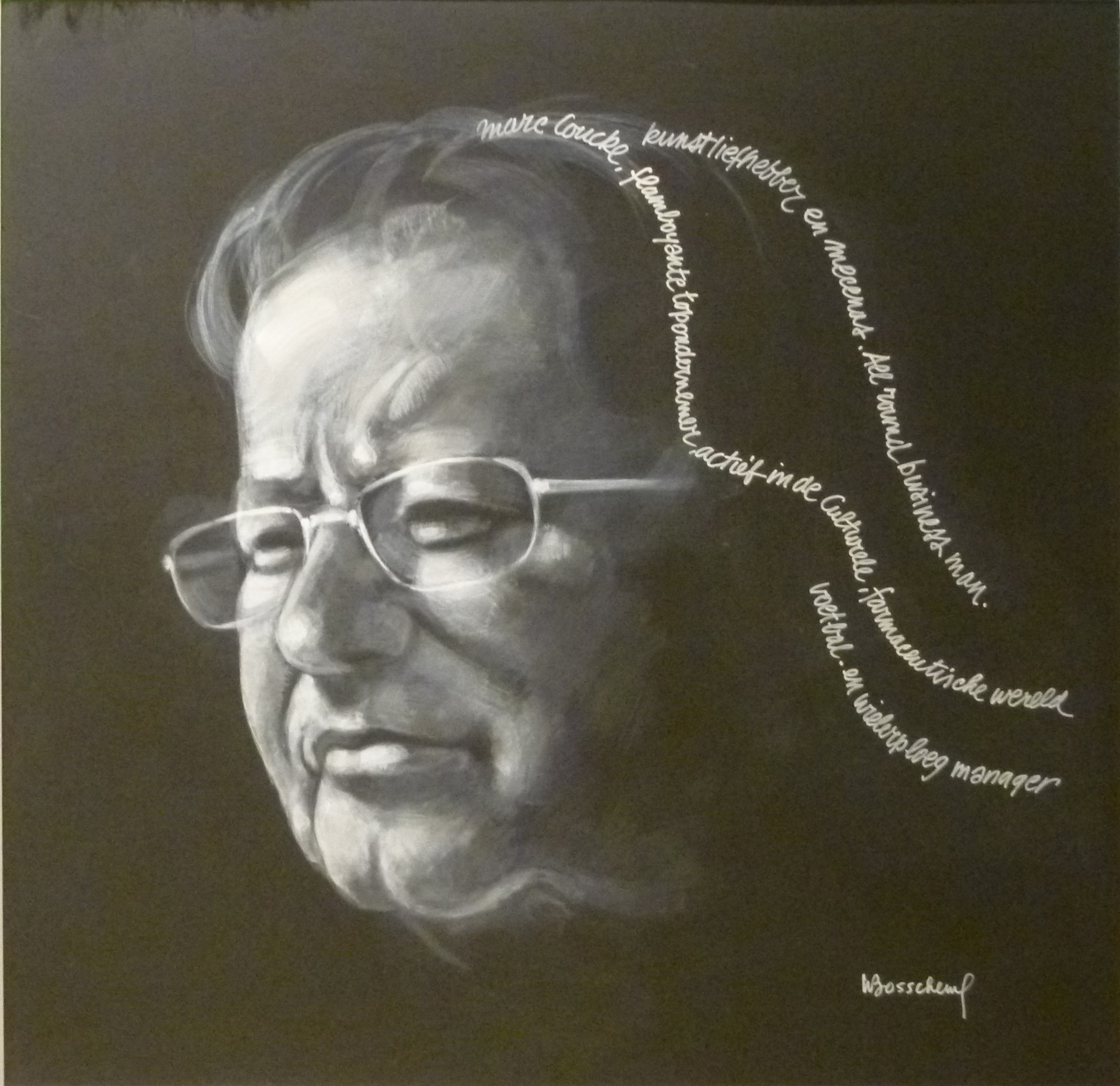
Marc Coucke, portrait by the Belgian artist Willy Bosschem

== Career ==
In 1987, he co-founded Omega Pharma with Yvan Vindevogel. This Belgian pharmaceuticals company grew rapidly and in 2006 employed three thousand people whilst operating in thirty countries. He remained Chief Executive Officer of Omega Pharma until 30 September 2006, returning to the post in March 2008. Whilst his business profile represents considerable achievement there have been highly publicised failures that include the launch of Omega Pharma's E-Waves phone Chip in 2008. It was withdrawn shortly after release as it did not work. In August 2021 Coucke, together with investment fund Waterland, was convicted to pay €266 million to pharmaceuticals company Perrigo in a dispute over the takeover of Omega Pharma.

After selling Omega Pharma Coucke has become a major investor in mostly Belgian businesses with his investment company Alychlo across several sectors like real estate, construction, pharma, technology, food industry and entertainment. In Durbuy, he owns Adventure Valley, a golf club, a five-star hotel “Le Sanglier des Ardennes”, and "Les Jardins de Durbuy", which is a holiday park with 237 chalets. Most eye-catching was becoming the major shareholder and chairman of Belgian football club RSC Anderlecht in January 2018 while he already did this before with KV Oostende in 2013.

In 2007, he was featured as a member of the jury in the television show De bedenkers.

== Personal ==
Coucke is married and has two daughters. He lives in the newly renovated eighteenth-century Castle Mijl Eke in Merelbeke in east Flanders.
