= AEX cfiXML =

The FIATECH AEX cfiXML schemas have been developed to automate information exchange for the design, procurement, delivery, installation, operation and maintenance of engineered equipment. Though large companies may have internal software integration systems, data exchange between collaborating companies commonly requires labor-intensive and costly re-entry of data into in-house systems. AEX cfiXML schemas provide a standard language to enable interoperability, allowing information flow to and from multiple software systems within a company or with other companies. The potential annual savings for capital facility industries are millions of dollars.

AEX cfiXML schemas provide extensive coverage of different types of engineered equipment including shell and tube heat exchangers, electric motors, centrifugal pumps and fans, reciprocating and centrifugal compressors, and block and control valves. The schemas have been effectively demonstrated transferring data sets from a common data sheet-style format, via various synthesis programs, and into a purchaser's comparison system (Bid Tab). This represents a procurement sequence of events for, in the example demonstration, centrifugal pumps. An example of AEX cfiXML implementation involves standardizing valve specifications so that facility owners, suppliers and manufacturers can efficiently and reliably exchange their in-house valve data.

Schema structure includes data revision and change traffic support, and life cycle status detail, so applications can be developed to monitor data alterations over time and maintain records throughout the life-cycle of an equipment item. Units of measurement are also supported by the schemas, so AEX cfiXML can be used within the USA or internationally.

AEX cfiXML is an object-oriented model designed as a pragmatic solution for real-life usage contexts. The design principles have been based on extensive research in the available resources in the XML schema development community and verified through trial implementations with available XML parsers. Extensibility, reusability, ease of processing and ease of writing XML files have all been considered to ensure the best combination for cfiXML use.

AEX cfiXML is a collaborative development and in the public domain.
