= Ordina =

Ordina (Russian: Ордина) is a surname. Notable people with this surname include:

- Aleksandra Ordina (born 1987), Russian amateur boxer
- Antonina Ordina (born 1962), Soviet and Swedish cross-country skier
- Tibor Ordina (1971–2016), Hungarian long jumper and triple jumper
- Vera Ordina (born 1968), Russian hurdler
