= AEX index =

Dutch stock market index

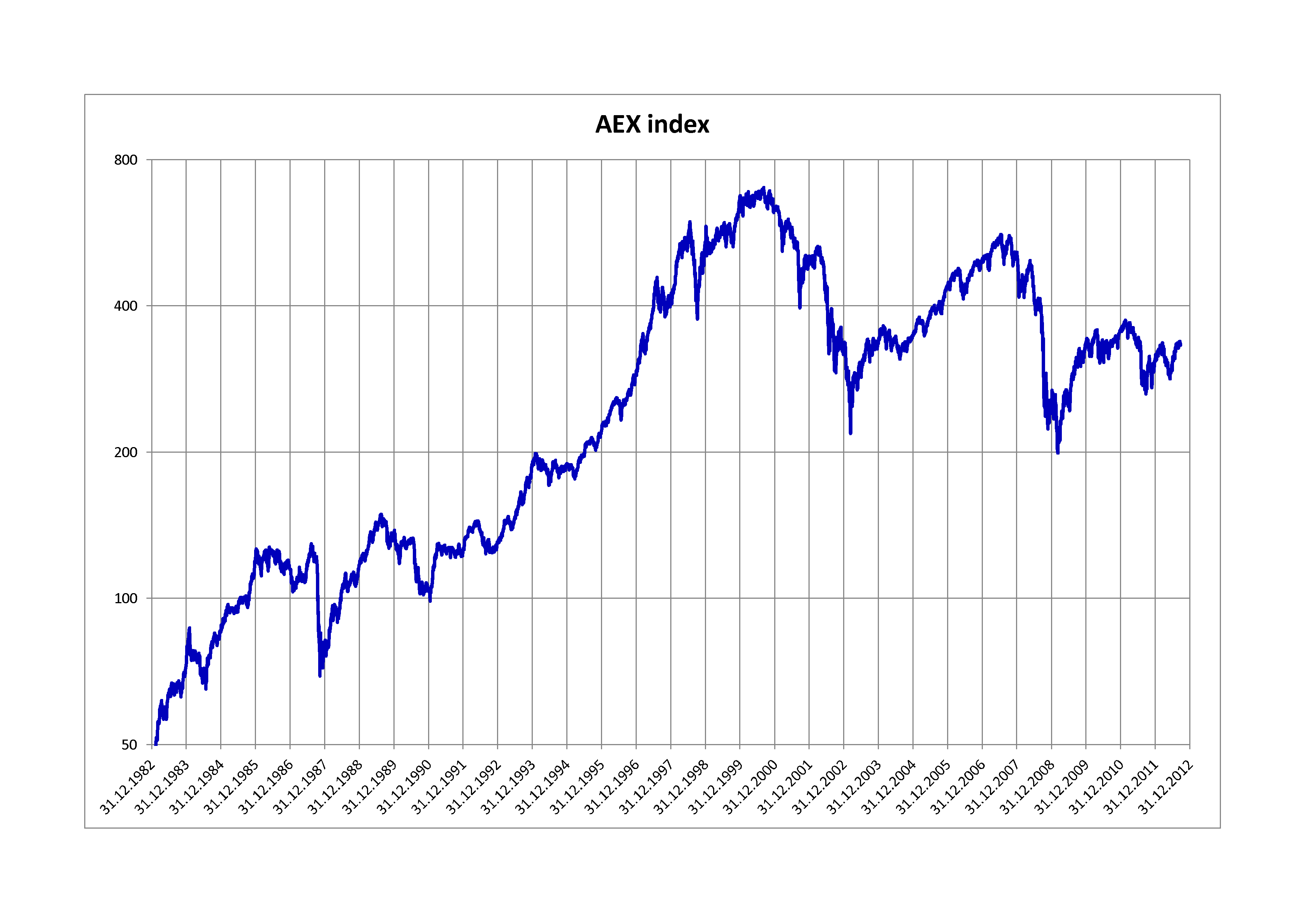
- AEX index performance between 1982 and 2012
- Foundation: 1983
- Operator: Euronext
- Exchanges: Euronext Amsterdam
- Constituents: up to 25 (1990–2025) up to 30 (since 2025)
- Type: Large cap
- Market cap: €850,8 billion (Begin March 2021)
- Weighting method: Capitalization-weighted
- Related indices: AMX index, AScX index
- Website: www.aex.nl

The AEX index, derived from Amsterdam Exchange index, is a stock market index composed of Dutch companies that trade on Euronext Amsterdam, formerly known as the Amsterdam Stock Exchange. Started in 1983, the index is composed of a maximum of 30 of the most frequently traded securities on the exchange. It is one of the main national indices of the stock exchange group Euronext alongside Euronext Brussels' BEL20, Euronext Dublin's ISEQ 20, Euronext Lisbon's PSI-20, the Oslo Bors OBX Index, and Euronext Paris's CAC 40.

== History ==
The AEX started from a base level of 100 index points on 3 January 1983 (a corresponding value of 45.378 is used for historic comparisons due to the adoption of the Euro). The index's peak to date was set on 26 October 2021 816.91 After the dot-com bubble in 1999, the index value more than halved over the following three years before recovering in line with most global financial markets.

The AEX index dealt with its second largest one-day loss on 12 March 2020, when the index closed down almost 11% during the coronavirus pandemic. The AEX index enjoyed its third largest one-day loss on 29 September 2008, when the index closed down almost 9%. The decade between 1998 and 2008 was bad for the AEX index, as it was the worst performing stock index except for the OMX Iceland 15. The preceding years were a lot better compared to the rest of the world.

== Annual returns ==
The following table shows the annual development of the AEX index since 1983.

Year	Closing level	Change in index in points	Change in index in %
1983	73.21		
1984	85.75	12.54	17.13
1985	121.50	35.75	41.69
1986	114.69	−6.81	−5.60
1987	77.87	−36.82	−32.10
1988	117.68	39.81	51.12
1989	136.59	18.91	16.07
1990	104.01	−32.58	−23.85
1991	125.72	21.71	20.87
1992	129.71	3.99	3.17
1993	187.99	58.28	44.93
1994	188.08	0.09	0.05
1995	220.24	32.16	17.10
1996	294.16	73.92	33.56
1997	414.61	120.45	40.95
1998	538.46	123.85	29.87
1999	671.41	132.96	24.69
2000	637.60	−33.81	−5.04
2001	506.78	−130.82	−20.52
2002	322.73	−184.05	−36.32
2003	337.65	14.92	4.62
2004	348.08	10.43	3.09
2005	436.78	88.70	25.48
2006	495.34	58.56	13.41
2007	515.77	20.43	4.12
2008	245.94	−269.83	−52.32
2009	335.33	89.39	36.35
2010	354.57	19.24	5.74
2011	312.47	−42.10	−11.87
2012	342.71	30.24	9.68
2013	401.79	59.08	17.24
2014	424.47	22.68	5.64
2015	441.82	17.35	4.09
2016	483.17	41.35	9.36
2017	544.58	61.41	12.71
2018	487.88	−56.70	−10.41
2019	604.58	116.70	23.92
2020	624.61	20.03	3.31
2021	797.93	173.32	27.75
2022	689.01	-108.92	-13.65
2023	786.82	97.81	14.20
2024	878.63	91.81	11.67
2025	951.29	72.66	8.27

== Rules ==
=== Selection ===
As of 2011, the AEX index composition is reviewed four times a year - a full "annual" review in March and interim "quarterly" reviews in June, September and December. Any changes made as a result of the reviews take effect on the third Friday of the month. Previously reviews were held in March and September only. Prior to 2008, index changes were made only annually in March.

At the main March review date, the 23 companies listed on Euronext Amsterdam's regulated market with the highest share turnover (in Euros) over the previous year are admitted to the index. Of the companies ranked between 24th and 27th, a further two are selected with preference given to existing constituents of the index. Companies which have fewer than 25% of shares considered free float on Euronext Amsterdam are, however, ineligible for inclusion. Unlike some other European benchmark equity indices (such as the OMXS30), if a company has more than one class of shares traded on the exchange, only the most frequently traded of these will be accepted into the AEX. If a company or companies are removed from the index due to delisting, acquisition or another reason, no replacements are made until the next review date.

At the three interim reviews in June, September and December, no changes are made to the AEX unless either the index has seen one or more constituents removed, or a non-constituent possesses a share turnover ranked 15th or higher overall over the previous 12 months. If vacancies are to be filled, the highest-ranking non-AEX companies are selected to join the index.

=== Weighting ===
The AEX is a capitalization-weighted index. At each main annual review, the index weightings of companies in the index are capped at 15%, but range freely with share price subsequently. The index weights are calculated with respect to the closing prices of the relevant companies on 1 March. At the interim reviews, weightings after adjustment are left as close as possible to those of the previous day and are not re-capped.

=== Calculation ===
The index comprises a basket of shares, the numbers of which are based on the constituent weights and index value at the time of readjustment. The value of the index at any given time, I_{t}, is calculated using the following formula:

$$I_t = \frac{\sum_{i=1}^N Q_{i,t}\,F_{i,t}\,f_{i,t}\,C_{i,t}\,}{d_{t}\,}$$

with t the day of calculation; N the number of constituent shares in the index (usually 25); Q_{i,t} the number of shares of company i on day t; F_{i,t} the free float factor of share i; f_{i,t} the capping factor of share i (exactly 1 for all companies not subject to the 15% cap); C_{i,t} the price of share i on day t; and d_{t} the index divisor (a factor calculated from the base capitalisation of the index, which is updated to reflect corporate actions and other index changes.

=== Contract Specifications ===
The AEX Index is traded as a future on the Euronext Equities & Index Derivatives exchange (EUREID) under the ticker symbol FTI. The size of each contract is 200 EURO x AEX Index points (e.g. 200 X 667.55 = €133,510).

Contract Specifications
AEX Index (FTI)	
Contract Size:	200 EURO x AEX Index Points
Exchange:	EUREID
Sector:	Index
Tick Size:	0.05
Tick Value:	10 EUR
Big Point Value (BPV):	200
Denomination:	EUR
Decimal Place:	2

== Composition ==
The index is composed of the following listings as of 31 December 2024.

Ticker	Company	ICB Sector	Index weighting (%)
ABN.AS	ABN AMRO	Financials	0.78
ADYEN.AS	Adyen	Industrials	4.82
AGN.AS	Aegon	Financials	0.89
AD.AS	Ahold Delhaize	Consumer Staples	3.41
AKZA.AS	AkzoNobel	Basic Materials	1.13
MT.AS	ArcelorMittal	Basic Materials	1.09
ASM.AS	ASM International	Technology	2.99
ASML.AS	ASML Holding	Technology	11.43
ASRNL.AS	ASR Nederland	Financials	0.77
BESI.AS	BE Semiconductors	Technology	1.16
DSFIR.AS	DSM Firmenich AG	Consumer Staples	2.37
EXO.AS	Exor	Financials	1.06
HEIA.AS	Heineken	Consumer Staples	2.25
IMCD.AS	IMCD	Basic Materials	0.93
INGA.AS	ING Group	Financials	5.73
KPN.AS	KPN	Telecommunications	1.58
NN.AS	NN Group	Financials	1.30
PHIA.AS	Philips	Health Care	2.16
PRX.AS	Prosus	Technology	6.39
RAND.AS	Randstad	Industrials	0.42
REN.AS	RELX	Consumer Discretionary	9.38
SHELL.AS	Shell plc	Energy	14.92
UMG.AS	Universal Music Group	Consumer Discretionary	2.05
UNA.AS	Unilever	Consumer Staples	16.46
WKL.AS	Wolters Kluwer	Consumer Discretionary	4.54

== See also ==
- AMX index, the market index of the next 25 largest funds on Euronext Amsterdam.
- AScX index, market index of 20 small caps on Euronext Amsterdam.
