= Naamloze vennootschap =

Type of business entity under Dutch law

Naamloze vennootschap (Dutch pronunciation: [ˈnaːmloːzə ˈvɛnoːtsxɑp]; abbreviated as N.V. or NV [ɛnˈveː] (Note: Although according to the official Dutch spelling, naamloze vennootschap should be abbreviated as 'nv', article 2:66 of the Dutch Civil Code prescribes that the name of any naamloze vennootschap starts or ends with "Naamloze Vennootschap" or abbreviated as "N.V.".) or Société anonyme (SA) in the French Community of Belgium) is a type of public company defined by business law in the Netherlands, Belgium, Indonesia (where it is known as perseroan terbatas, abbreviated PT and allows for private companies), and Suriname. The company is owned by shareholders, and the company's shares are not registered to certain owners, so that they may be traded on the public stock market.

The phrase literally means "nameless partnership" or "anonymous venture" and comes from the fact that the partners (the shareholders) are not directly known. This is in contrast to the term for a private limited company, which is called besloten vennootschap (an "exclusive" or "closed partnership", one in which stock is not for sale on open markets).

Each naamloze vennootschap is a legal entity in the Netherlands, Belgium, Aruba, Curaçao, Suriname, Sint Maarten and Indonesia. A minimum of €45,000 (€61,500) paid in capital is required to establish a Dutch (Belgian) nv. Establishing a Dutch nv is only possible by a notarial act by a Dutch civil law notary.

== See also ==
- AB (publ) (Publikt Aktiebolag) – the corresponding concept in Sweden and Finland
- AG (Aktiengesellschaft) – the corresponding concept in Liechtenstein, Germany, Austria, and Switzerland
- A/S (Aktieselskab) – the corresponding concept in Denmark
- AS (Aksjeselskap) – the corresponding concept in Norway
- Inc (Incorporated) – the corresponding concept in US
- KK (Kabushiki kaisha) – the corresponding concept in Japan
- Ltd (Limited) - The corresponding concept in Commonwealth countries such as India and other countries which is for public companies just Ltd or private companies with Pvt Ltd or Pte Ltd in Singapore.
- Oyj (Julkinen Osakeyhtiö) – the corresponding concept in Finland
- Plc (Public Limited Company) - the corresponding concept in the UK and Ireland
- S.A. - the corresponding concept in Latin America, Portugal, France, Spain, and other Romanic countries, also in Poland and the Walloon region of Belgium
- SE (Societas Europaea) – additional legal structure of a company available in the European Union
- S.p.A. (Società per Azioni) - the corresponding concept in San Marino and Italy
- List of legal entity types by country
