= Euronext Amsterdam =

Stock exchange in Amsterdam, Netherlands

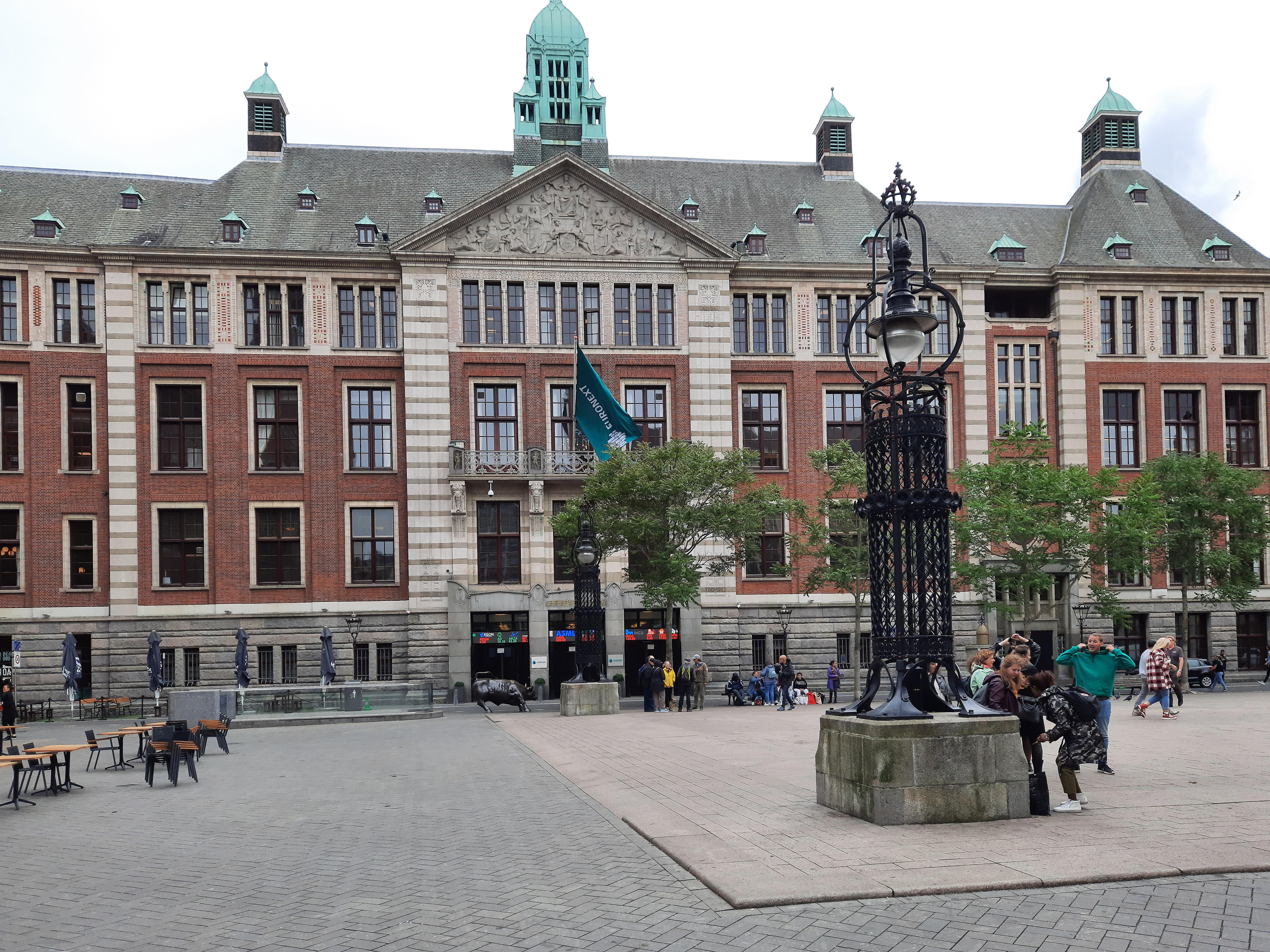
- Euronext Amsterdam building at Beursplein 5
- Type: Stock exchange
- Location: Amsterdam, Netherlands
- Coordinates: 52.3742°N 4.8957°E
- Founded: 1602/1606
- Owner: Euronext
- Key people: René van Vlerken (CEO)
- Currency: EUR
- No. of listings: 140
- Indices: AEX index; AMX index; AScX index
- Website: live.euronext.com/en/markets/amsterdam

Euronext Amsterdam is a stock exchange based in Amsterdam, Netherlands. Formerly known as the Amsterdam Stock Exchange (Dutch: Amsterdamse effectenbeurs), it merged on 22 September 2000 with the Brussels Stock Exchange and the Paris Stock Exchange to form Euronext. The registered office of Euronext, itself incorporated in the Netherlands a public limited company (naamloze vennootschap), is also located in the exchange.

== History ==
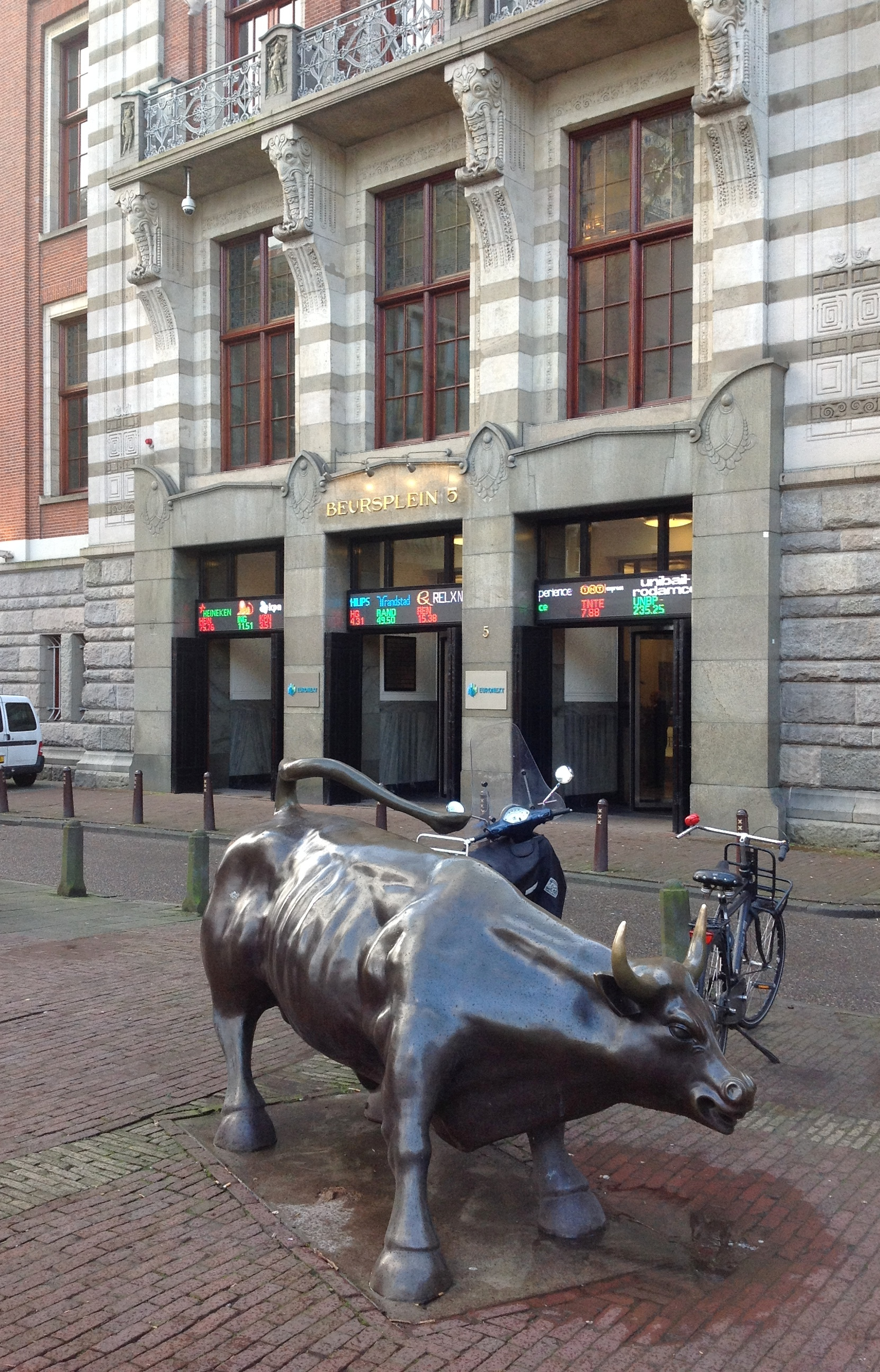
Entrance of the stock exchange building and bull

The Amsterdam stock exchange is considered the oldest "modern" securities market in the world. It was created shortly after the establishment of the Dutch East India Company (Dutch: Vereenigde Oostindische Compagnie abbreviated VOC) in 1602 when equities began trading on a regular basis as a secondary market to trade its shares. Prior to that, the market existed primarily for the exchange of commodities. It was subsequently renamed the Amsterdam Bourse and was the first to formally begin trading in securities. Joseph de la Vega's Confusion of Confusions (1688) is the first full-length work about the stock exchange, its participants and shareholders.

In 1602, the States General of the Netherlands granted the VOC a 21-year charter over all Dutch trade in Asia and quasi-governmental powers. The monopolistic terms of the charter effectively granted the VOC complete authority over trade defenses, war armaments, and political endeavors in Asia. The high level of risk associated with trade in Asia gave the VOC its private ownership structure. Following in the footsteps of the English East India Company, stock in the corporation was sold to a large pool of interested investors, who in turn received a guarantee of some future share of profits. In the Amsterdam East India House alone, 1,143 investors subscribed for over ƒ3,679,915.

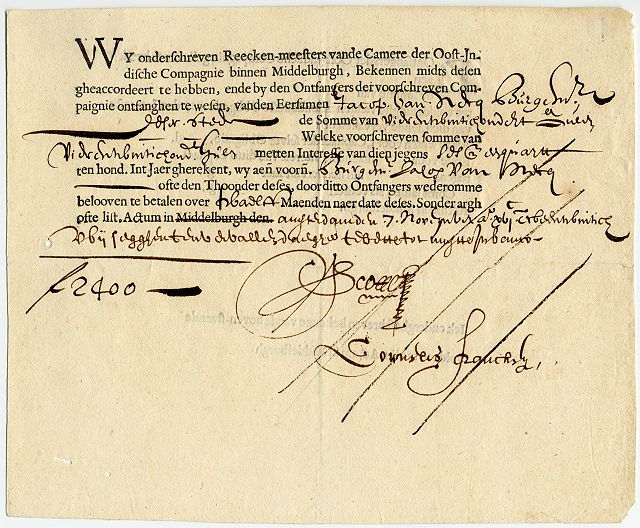
A bond from the Dutch East India Company, dating from 7 November 1623, for the amount of 2,400 florins

Although it is considered by some to be the first modern stock market, there were limited markets for something similar to shares in Venice, Florence, Genoa, Germany, or Spain several centuries earlier.

It is not quite accurate to call [Amsterdam] the first stock market, as people often do. State loan stocks had been negotiable at a very early date in Venice, in Florence before 1328, and in Genoa, where there was an active market in the luoghi and paghe of Casa di San Giorgio, not to mention the Kuxen shares in the German mines which were quoted as early as the fifteenth century at the Leipzig fairs, the Spanish juros, the French rentes sur l'Hotel de Ville (municipal stocks) (1522) or the stock market in the Hanseatic towns from the fifteenth century. The statutes of Verona in 1318 confirm the existence of the settlement or forward market ... In 1428, the jurist Bartolomeo de Bosco protested against the sale of forward loca in Genoa. All evidence points to the Mediterranean as the cradle of the stock market. But what was new in Amsterdam was the volume, the fluidity of the market and publicity it received, and the speculative freedom of transactions.

— Fernand Braudel (1983)

The subscription terms of each stock purchase offered shareholders the option to transfer their shares to a third party. Quickly a secondary market arose in the East India House for resale of this stock through the official bookkeeper. After an agreement had been reached between the two parties, the shares were then transferred from seller to buyer in the "capital book". The official account, held by the East India House, encouraged investors to trade and gave rise to market confidence that the shares were not just being transferred on paper. A big acceleration in the turnover rate came in 1623, after the 21-year liquidation period for the VOC ended. The terms of the initial charter called for a full liquidation after 21 years to distribute profits to shareholders. However, at this time neither the VOC nor its shareholders saw a slowing down of Asian trade, so the States General of the Netherlands granted the corporation a second charter in the West Indies.

This new charter gave the VOC additional years to stay in business but, in contrast to the first charter, outlined no plans for immediate liquidation, meaning that the money invested remained invested, and dividends were paid to investors to incentivize shareholding. Investors took to the secondary market of the newly constructed Amsterdam Stock Exchange to sell their shares to third parties. These "fixed" capital stock transactions amassed huge turnover rates, and made the stock exchange vastly more important. The voyage to the precious resources in the West Indies was risky. Threats of pirates, disease, misfortune, shipwreck, and various macroeconomic factors heightened the risk factor and thus made the trip wildly expensive. So, the stock issuance made possible the spreading of risk and dividends across a pool of investors. Should something go wrong on the voyage, risk was mitigated and dispersed throughout the pool and investors all suffered just a fraction of the total expense of the voyage.

The system of privatizing national expeditions was not new to Europe, but the fixed stock structure of the East India Company made it one of a kind. In the decade preceding the formation of the VOC, adventurous Dutch merchants had used a similar method of "private partnership" to finance expensive voyages to the East Indies for their personal gain. The ambitious merchants pooled money together to create shipping partnerships for exploration of the East Indies. They assumed a joint-share of the necessary preparations (i.e., shipbuilding, stocking, navigation) in return for a joint-share of the profits. These Voorcompagnieën took on extreme risk to reap some of the rewarding spice trade in the East Indies, but introduced a common form of the joint-stock venture into Dutch shipping.

Although some of these voyages predictably failed, the ones that were successful brought promise of wealth and an emerging new trade. Shortly after these expeditions began, in 1602, the many independent Voorcompagnieën merged to form the Dutch East India Trading Company. Shares were allocated appropriately by the Amsterdam Stock Exchange and the joint-stock merchants became the directors of the new VOC. Furthermore, this new mega-corporation was immediately recognized by the Dutch provinces to be equally important in governmental procedures. The VOC was granted significant war-time powers, the right to build forts, the right to maintain a standing army, and permission to conduct negotiations with Asian countries. The charter created a Dutch colonial province in Indonesia, with a monopoly on Euro-Asian trade.

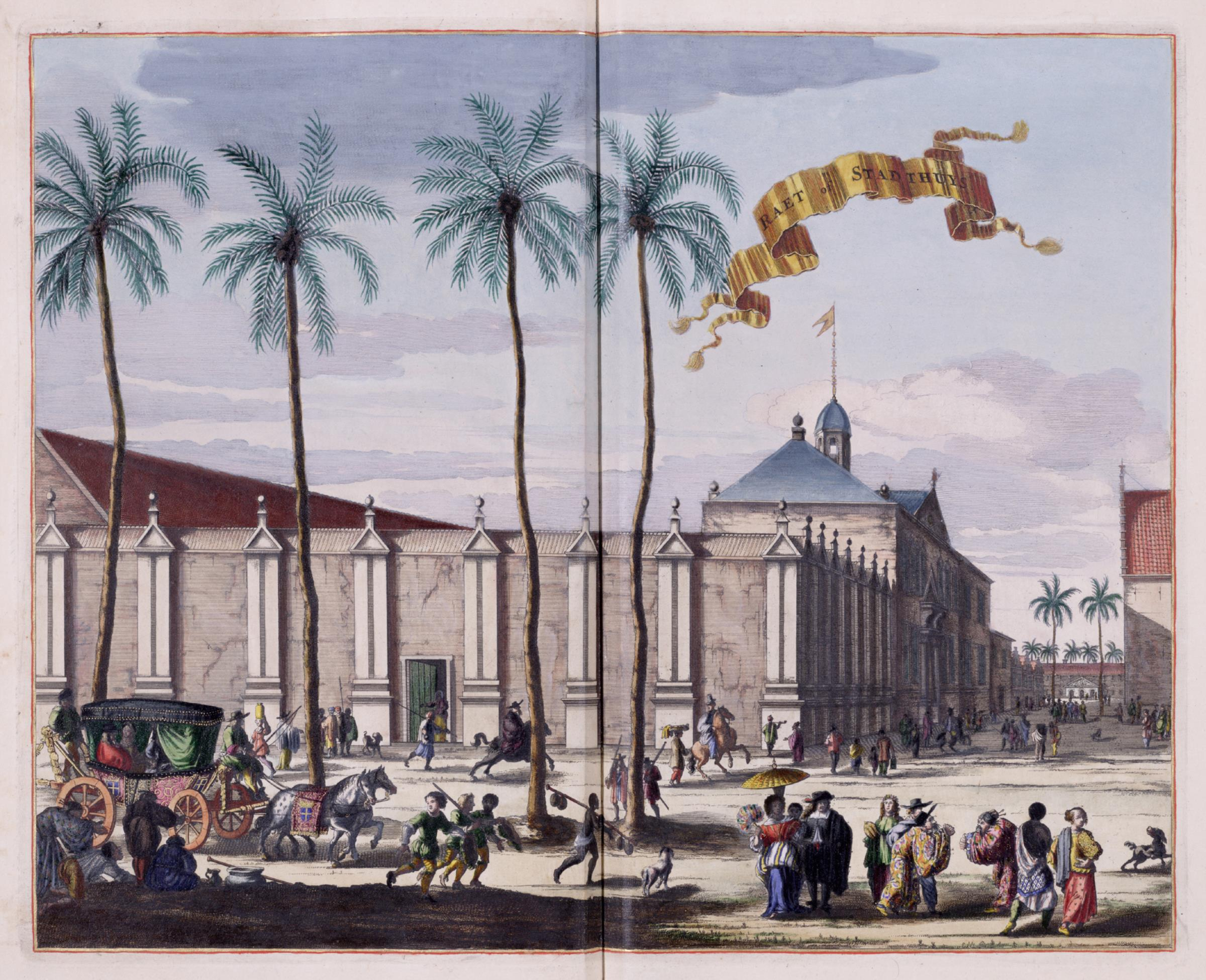
The city hall of Batavia, during the Dutch East Indies period

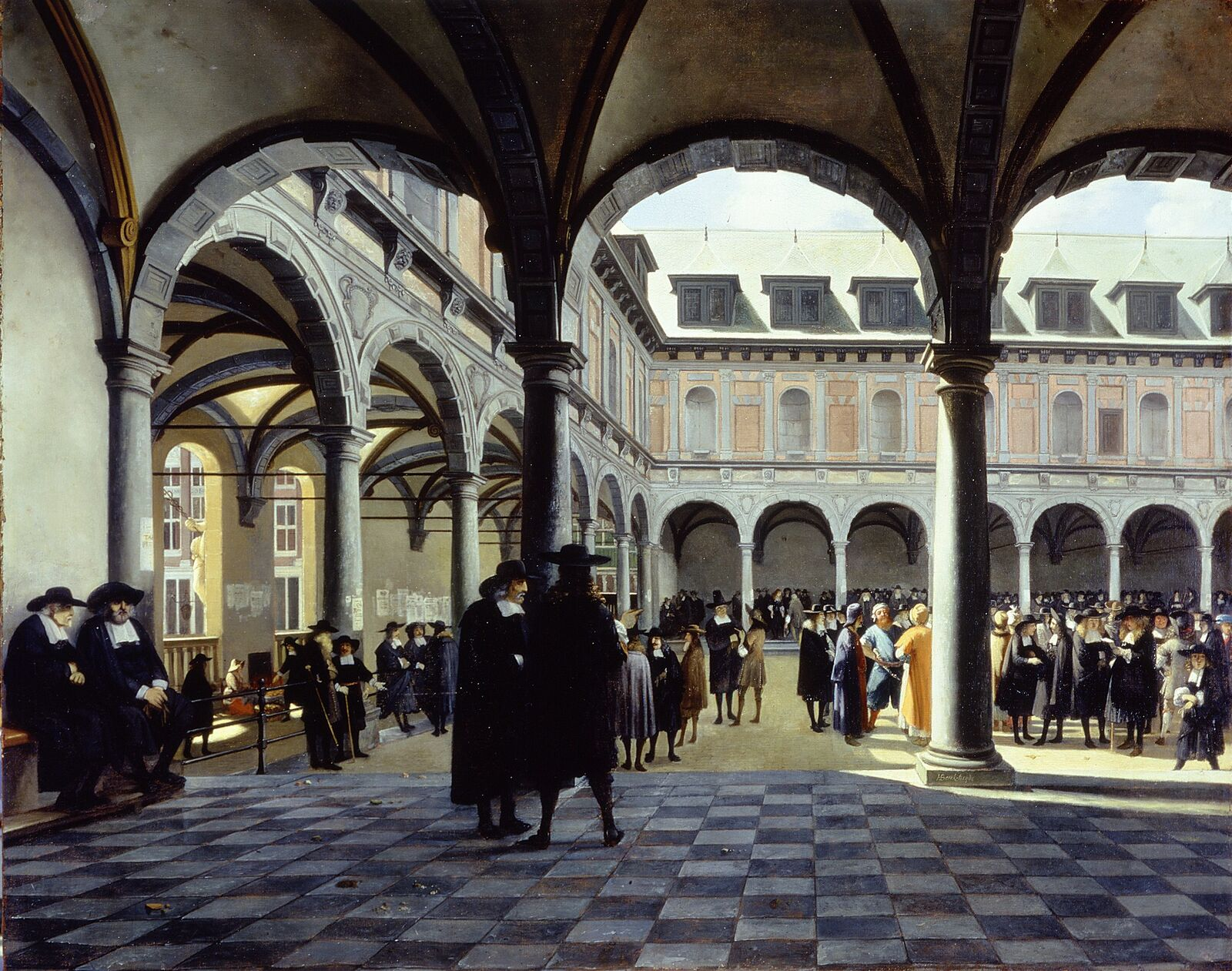
Courtyard of the Amsterdam Stock Exchange, circa 1670

The rapid development of the Amsterdam Stock exchange in the mid-17th century led to the formation of trading clubs around the city. Traders met frequently, often in a local coffee shop or inns to discuss financial transactions. Thus, "Sub-markets" emerged, in which traders had access to peer knowledge and a community of reputable traders.

These were particularly important during trading in the late 17th century, where short-term speculative trading dominated. The trading clubs allowed investors to attain valuable information from reputable traders about the future of the securities trade. Experienced traders on the inside circle of these trading clubs had a slight advantage over everyone else, and the prevalence of these clubs played a major role in the continued growth of the stock exchange itself.

Additionally, similarities can be drawn between modern day brokers and the experienced traders of the trading clubs. The network of traders allowed for organized movement of knowledge and quick execution of transactions. Thus, the secondary market for VOC shares became extremely efficient, and trading clubs played no small part. Brokers took a small fee in exchange for a guarantee that the paperwork would be appropriately filed and a "buyer" or "seller" would be found. Throughout the 17th century, investors increasingly sought experienced brokers to seek information about a potential counterparty.

The European Options Exchange (EOE) was founded in 1978 in Amsterdam as a futures and options exchange. In 1983, it started a stock market index, called the EOE index, consisting of the 25 largest companies that trade on the stock exchange. Forward contracts, options, and other sophisticated instruments were traded on the Amsterdam Stock Exchange well before this.

In 1997, the Amsterdam Stock Exchange and the EOE merged, and its blue chip index was renamed AEX, for "Amsterdam EXchange". It is now managed by Euronext Amsterdam. On 3 October 2011, Princess Máxima opened the new trading floor of the Amsterdam Stock Exchange.

The former Stock Exchange building was the Beurs van Berlage.

=== Buildings ===
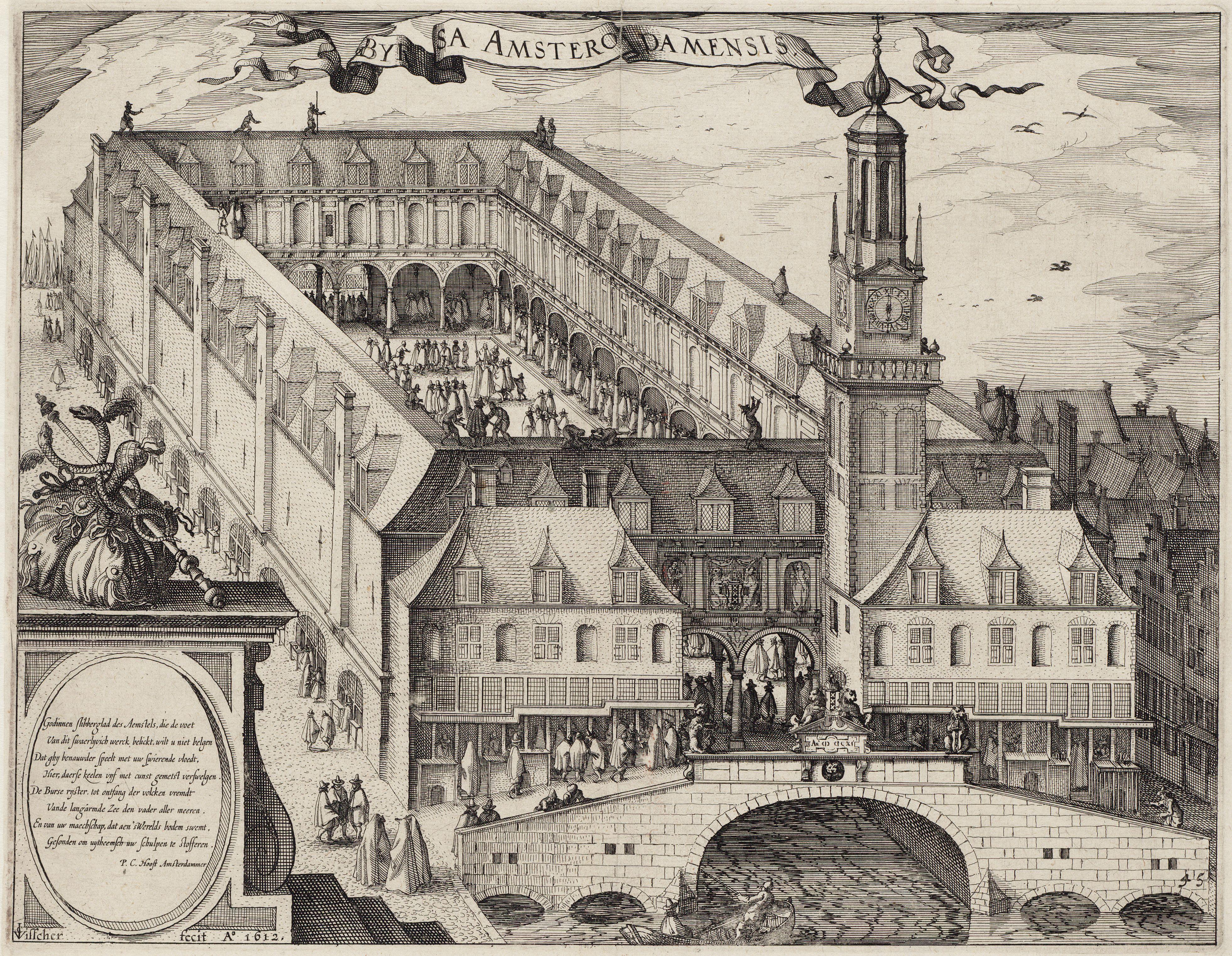
Engraving depicting the Amsterdam Stock Exchange, built by Hendrik de Keyser 1608-11 on the Rokin

The Amsterdam Bourse, an open-air venue, was created as a commodity exchange in 1530 and rebuilt in 1608. The city of Amsterdam had decided, that it deserved a proper building for the stock exchange. Rather than being a bazaar where goods were traded intermittently, exchanges had the advantage of being a regularly meeting market, which enabled traders to become more specialized and engage in more complicated transactions. As early as the middle of the 16th century, people in Amsterdam speculated in grain and, somewhat later, in herring, spices, whale-oil, and even tulips. The Amsterdam Bourse in particular was the place where this kind of business was carried on. This institution began as an open-air market in Warmoestreet, later moved for a while to the 'New Bridge' (Nieuwe Brug). Early trading in Amsterdam in the early 16th century (1560s-1611) largely occurred by the Nieuwe Brug bridge, which crosses the Damrak near Amsterdam Harbor. Its proximity to the harbor and incoming mail made it a sensible location for traders to be the first to get the latest commercial news. Trading also flourished in the 'church square' near the Oude Kerk.

The city of Amsterdam then ordered the construction of an exchange in Dam Square. It was built by Hendrick de Keyser and opened for business in 1611. Various sections of the building were marked for commodity trading and VOC securities. The Dutch East India Company (abbreviated VOC) introduced risk management innovations motivated by international trade and venture capital (VC). Limited liability and equity shares were pioneered at the Amsterdam stock exchange.

A bylaw on trade in the city of Amsterdam dictated that trade could only take place in the exchange on weekdays from 11 a.m. to noon. While only a short amount of time for trading inside the building, the window created a flurry of investors that in turn made it easier for buyers to find sellers and vice versa. Thus, the building of the stock exchange led to a vast expansion of liquidity in the marketplace. In addition, trading was continued in other buildings, outside of the trading hours of the exchange, such as the trading clubs, and was not prohibited in hours outside of those outlined in the bylaw.

The location of exchange relative to the East India House was also strategic. Its proximity gave investors the luxury of walking a short distance to both register the transaction in the official books of the VOC, and complete the money transfer in the nearby Exchange Bank, also in Dam square.

Jan David Zocher constructed a new building for the exchange near the Dam/Damrak. It opened in 1845 and was designed as a Greek temple with columns in front. Between 1896 and 1903 the large red brick Beurs van Berlage on the Damrak was constructed. It became the building of the Amsterdam exchanges in 1903. Today it serves as a venue for concerts, exhibitions and conferences.

In 1914 the stock exchange moved to a new building in Beursplein 5, next to the old building, where it remains today.

== See also ==
- Dōjima Rice Exchange
