= The European Railway Award =

Industry award for rail supporters

The European Railway Award was initiated in 2007 and is jointly organised by the Community of European Railway and Infrastructure Companies (CER), and the Union des Industries Ferroviaires Européennes, the Association of the European Rail Industry (UNIFE).

== Award ceremony and annual reception ==
The European Railway Award honours outstanding political and technical achievements in the development of economically and environmentally sustainable rail transport. The award is held annually in Brussels with over 500 participants. The award includes prize money, which is donated to the charitable organizations of the laureates’ choice. The jury consists of CEOs of rail companies and other stakeholders from the transport sector. The Award Ceremony is followed by the joint CER-UNIFE Annual Reception.

From 2007-2016, two awards (one political, one technical) were given out. In 2017, for the tenth anniversary of the award, no awards were given out, and then from 2018 to 2020, the two awards were merged. In 2021, the ceremony was held online, with delivery of two awards, one political and one general. Since 2022 (and as of 2026) two sets of awards are once again given out, the "Rail Champion," for "outstanding political contributions to the advancement of rail transport," and "Rail Trailblazer," for "technical excellence and innovation."

== Political Awards (2007-16, 2022-) ==
=== Rail Champion (2022-) ===
| Year | Name | Achievements | Ref |
|---|---|---|---|
| 2022 | Manfred Weber | Then-Chairman of the EPP, for "his legislative support of rail travel among youth" | |
| 2023 | Ukrainian Railways (UZ) | For "remarkable resilience and continuation of transport services in war times" | |
| 2024 | Violeta Bulc | Former EU Transport Commissioner, for "her work promoting women in transport professions" | |
| 2025 | Enrico Letta | The former Italian Prime Minister, for his efforts "to promote rail as a key driver for European growth and prosperity" | |
| 2026 | Polish Presidency of the Council of the EU | For delivering an exceptionally rich programme for rail." Poland held the presidency from 1 January-30 June 2025. | |

=== Political Award (2007-16) ===
| Year | Name | Achievements |
|---|---|---|
| 2007 | Karel van Miert | As European Commissioner for Transport (1989-1993), Karel van Miert laid the foundations for the creation of an integrated European railway market. |
| 2009 | Moritz Leuenberger | Formerly Swiss Minister responsible for Environment, Transport, Energy and Communications, Leuenberger set out a blueprint for a sustainable transport policy in Switzerland. With the aim of transferring goods traffic from the roads to the rails, he promoted the Swiss “Heavy Vehicles Fee” (LSVA), which came into operation on 1 January 2001 on the Swiss public road network after a national referendum. To reduce Switzerland’s CO_{2} emissions, Leuenberger also promoted an incentive tax on fossil fuels, which entered into force at the beginning of 2008. |
| 2010 | Felipe González | González, former Spanish Prime Minister, was awarded for the decision to build a new, high-speed railway line between Madrid and Seville in 1986, which entered into service in 1992. He was also awarded for the implementation of the "Plan Felipe", which changed the railway's role in Spain’s big cities. |
| 2011 | Ken Livingstone | British Labour politician and former Mayor of London, Ken Livingstone received the award for his decision to implement the Congestion Charge in inner London on 17 February 2003. |
| 2012 | Karel Vinck | Vinck, former CEO of the SNCB, received the Political Award for his contributions to the development of ERTMS as the European ERTMS Corridor Coordinator. Vinck supervised the implementation of ERTMS on the six ERTMS corridors. |
| 2013 | Benedikt Weibel | Weibel, the CEO of Swiss Federal Railways (SBB), had a major influence on its strategic direction. He received the Political Award for his systematic and successful progress in long-distance, regional and international services. He inaugurated Rail 2000 on 12 December 2004. Under his leadership the density of trains per line kilometer doubled. |
| 2014 | Jacques Barrot | Former European Commissioner for Transport |
| 2015 | Lord Andrew Adonis | Former UK Secretary of State for Transport |
| 2016 | Isabelle Durant | Former Vice-President of the European Parliament |

== Rail Trailblazer (2022-) ==
=== Rail Trailblazer (2022-) ===
| Year | Name | Achievements | Ref |
|---|---|---|---|
| 2022 | Bane NOR’s ERTMS programme | for "its plan to invest more than €2 billion in adopting ERTMS, and enable future digitalisation and automation" | |
| 2023 | Eglė Šimė | CEO of LTG Cargo, for her focus on "empowering women in railways while ably steering her company through tumultuous times" | |
| 2024 | Danish State Railways (DSB) | For "pioneering a new train operator profile for their S-trains" | |
| 2025 | No award given out in this category | | |
| 2026 | Letter to the EC from members, urging the development of an EU high‑speed rail network | For a "highly significant boost to the growing political momentum behind high-speed rail expansion in Europe as a lever of enhanced European mobility and economic growth" | |

=== Technical Award (2007-2016) ===
| Year | Name | Achievements |
|---|---|---|
| 2007 | Jean Dupuy | Dupuy received the Technical Award for his decisive role in designing and putting into operational service Europe’s first high-speed train, the French TGV. |
| 2009 | Bengt Sterner | Sterner received his award for his leading role in initiating the UIC ETCS Project and in specifying the European Train Control System ETCS. |
| 2010 | Roland Heinisch | Heinisch, a long-standing member of the executive board of Deutsche Bahn AG and head of the German infrastructure manager, has significantly contributed to the technical development of railways. |
| 2011 | Stefan Haas | Haas received the Technical Award for the development of eddy current brakes for high-speed train systems that became a regular feature of high-speed train travel. |
| 2012 | François Lacôte | Lacôte was the designer of the first TGV trains in 1971. |
| 2013 | Johannes Nicolin | Johannes Nicolin received the Technical Award for his innovations, especially those in intermodal freight wagons. |
| 2014 | Giorgio Diana | Researcher and Professor of Mechanical Engineering at Politecnico di Milano |
| 2015 | Alexander Neumeister | Industrial designer |
| 2016 | Eric Fontanel | Railway engineer |

== Other award recipients ==
=== Joint Award recipients (2017-2021) ===
| Year | Name | Achievements |
|---|---|---|
| 2017 | N/A | No awards were handed out in 2017, for the tenth anniversary. |
| 2018 | The Gotthard Base Tunnel Project | The tunnel is the world's longest railway tunnel, and allowed for a modal shift of freight from road to rail. |
| 2019 | Catherine Trautmann | European Coordinator for the TEN-T North Sea-Baltic Corridor, former MEP, and former Mayor of Strasbourg |
| 2020 | Geert Pauwels | Geert Pauwels made rail freight profitable as CEO of Lineas, by restructuring the indebted Belgian company |
| 2021 | iLint hydrogen train project | for "the first commercial operation of fuel-cell-powered passenger trains – for providing a viable emission-free alternative to diesel on non-electrified networks." |

=== Other Awards ===
| Year | Award Name | Name | Achievements | Ref |
|---|---|---|---|---|
| 2021 | Outstanding Political Contributor | David Sassoli | EP President, for his "leading role in the 4th Railway Package" | |
| 2025 | Accomplishment Award | Josef Doppelbauer | a former Executive Director of the European Union Agency for Railways (2015-2024) | |
| 2025 | Lifetime Achievement Award | Dominique Riquet | A former MEP, who notably led negotiations for the revision of the TEN-T regulation | |

== Links ==
- European Railway Award

== Press review ==
- European Voice, Prestigious awards at the European railways industry annual reception, European Voice, 28 February 2013.
- Henri Borzi, European Railway Award 2013 assigned, BrusselsDiplomatic, 27 February 2013.
- Railway Gazette International, Awards encourage European railway integration, Railway Gazette International, 9 February 2012.
- De Standaard, Railway Award, 9 February 2012.
- The Parliament Magazine, Commissioner says railways have 'crucial' role in tackling climate change, The Parliament Magazine, 17 February 2011.
- Transport Business International, Rail sector celebrates European Railway Award, Transport Business International, 2011.
- Railway Gazette International, Kallas calls for change at European Railway Award, Railway Gazette International, 10 February 2011.
- Global Rail News, Ken Livingstone and Stefan Haas receive European Railway Award, Global Railway News, 10 February 2011.
- EurActiv, EU 'wise men' chief wants more rail, less road, EurActiv, 5 February 2010.
