= BEL 20 =

Blue chip stock market index

- BEL 20 performance between 1991 and 2025
- Foundation: 30 December 1990
- Operator: Euronext
- Exchanges: Euronext Brussels
- Constituents: 20
- Type: Large cap
- Market cap: €287.5 billion (end 2018)
- Weighting method: Capitalization-weighted
- Website: www.euronext.com

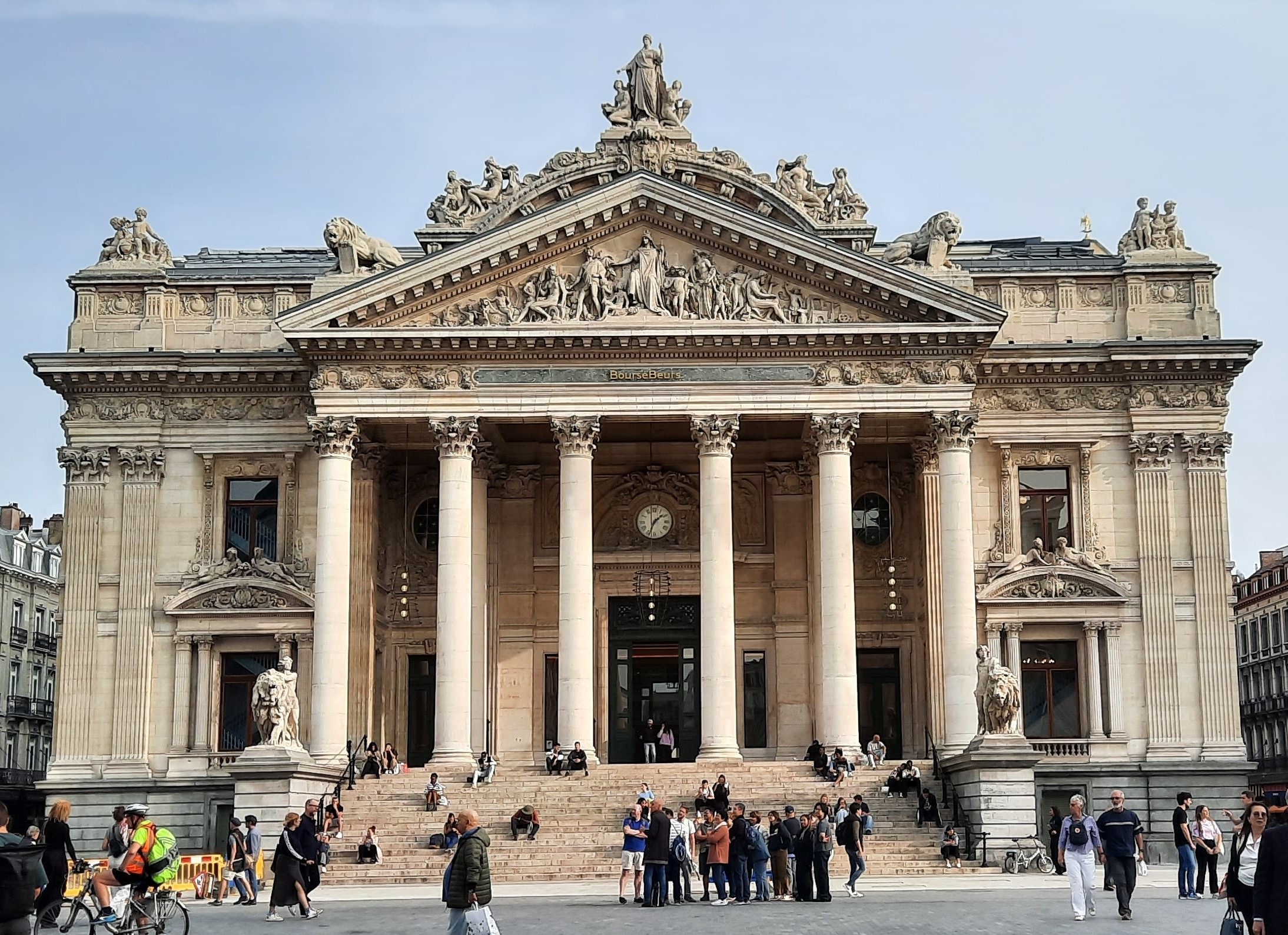
The former Brussels Stock Exchange building

The BEL 20 is the benchmark stock market index of Euronext Brussels. It tracks the performance of the 20 most capitalized and liquid stocks traded in Belgium. In general, the index consists of a minimum of 10 and a maximum of 20 companies traded at the Brussels Stock Exchange. Since 20 June 2011, the BEL 20 has contained 20 listings, with the exception of a one-month period in May–June 2018 when Ablynx stock was removed following the takeover by Sanofi, only to be replaced mid June by arGEN-X.

== Rules ==
The composition of the BEL 20 index is reviewed annually based on closing prices on the last Friday in February. These changes are effective after the third Friday of March. In addition to meeting a set of criteria demanding a company be "representative of the Belgian equity market", at least 15% of its shares must be considered free float in order to qualify for the index. In addition, a candidate for inclusion must possess a free float market capitalisation (in Euros) of at least 300,000 times the price of the index on the last trading day of December. The minimum requirement for an existing constituent to remain in the index is a market cap of 200,000 times the index value. At each annual review, the weights of companies in the index are capped at 15%, but range freely with share price subsequently. The BEL 20 is a capitalization-weighted index. Its record high before the 2008 financial crisis was 4,756.82, set on 23 May 2007.

== Annual returns ==
The following table shows the annual development of the BEL 20 Index, which was calculated back to 1990.

Year	Closing level	Change in Index in Points	Change in Index in %
1990	1,000.00		
1991	1,029.72	29.72	2.97
1992	1,127.02	97.30	9.45
1993	1,473.10	346.08	30.71
1994	1,389.64	−83.46	−5.67
1995	1,559.63	169.99	12.23
1996	1,897.58	337.95	21.67
1997	2,419.34	521.76	27.50
1998	3,514.51	1,095.17	45.27
1999	3,340.43	−174.08	−4.95
2000	3,024.49	−315.94	−9.46
2001	2,782.01	−242.48	−8.02
2002	2,025.04	−756.97	−27.21
2003	2,244.18	219.14	10.82
2004	2,932.62	688.44	30.68
2005	3,549.25	616.63	21.03
2006	4,288.53	739.28	20.83
2007	4,127.47	−161.06	−3.76
2008	1,908.64	−2,218.83	−53.76
2009	2,511.62	602.98	31.59
2010	2,578.60	66.98	2.67
2011	2,083.42	−495.18	−19.20
2012	2,475.81	392.39	18.83
2013	2,923.82	448.01	18.10
2014	3,285.26	361.44	12.36
2015	3,700.30	415.04	12.63
2016	3,606.36	−93.94	−2.54
2017	3,977.88	371.52	10.30
2018	3,243.63	−734.25	−18.46
2019	3,955.83	712.20	21.96
2020	3,621.28	−334.55	−8.46
2021	4,310.15	688.87	19.02
2022	3,701.17	−608.98	−14.13
2023	3,707.77	6.60	0.18
2024	4,264.53	556.76	15.02
2025	5,078.43	813.90	19.09

== Constituents ==
The following 20 stocks make up the BEL 20 as of March 31, 2026.

Company	ICB Sector	Ticker symbol	Index weighting (%)	In index since
AB InBev	Consumer Staples	Euronext Brussels: ABI	11.75	February 2002
Ackermans & van Haaren	Industrials	Euronext Brussels: ACKB	4.62	March 2007
Aedifica	Real Estate	Euronext Brussels: AED	5.25	March 2020
Ageas	Financials	Euronext Brussels: AGS	8.19	March 1991
arGEN-X	Health Care	Euronext Brussels: ARGX	12.56	June 2018
Aperam	Basic Materials	Euronext Amsterdam: APAM	1.22	March 2026
Azelis Group	Industrials	Euronext Brussels: AZE	1.47	June 2024
D'Ieteren	Consumer Discretionary	Euronext Brussels: DIE	2.77	March 2022
Elia Group	Utilities	Euronext Brussels: ELI	5.28	March 2021
GBL	Financials	Euronext Brussels: GBLB	4.65	March 1991
KBC	Financials	Euronext Brussels: KBC	11.72	January 1993
Lotus Bakeries	Consumer Staples	Euronext Brussels: LOTB	3.24	March 2024
Melexis	Electronic Equipment	Euronext Brussels: MELE	1.20	March 2021
Montea	Real Estate	Euronext Brussels: MONT	1.12	March 2025
Sofina	Financials	Euronext Brussels: SOF	2.49	March 2017
Solvay	Basic Materials	Euronext Brussels: SOLB	1.49	March 1991
Syensqo	Basic Materials	Euronext Brussels: SYENS	2.94	December 2023
UCB	Health Care	Euronext Brussels: UCB	12.36	March 1991
Umicore	Basic Materials	Euronext Brussels: UMI	2.60	March 1991
WDP	Real Estate	Euronext Brussels: WDP	3.43	March 2019

== Former companies in the BEL 20 ==
Company	ICB Sector	Ticker symbol	Period in BEL 20
Ablynx	pharmaceuticals	ABLX	March 2018 – June 2018
Agfa-Gevaert	electronic equipment	AGFB	March 1991 – December 1994; June 1999 – March 2009
Almanij	banks	No longer listed	March 1991 – March 2005
Barco	Industrial Goods & Services	BAR	March 1991 – January 1993; December 1996 – March 2007; March 2019 – March 2021
BarcoNet	electronic equipment		November 2000 – November 2000
Befimmo-Sicafi	industrial and office REITs	BEFB	March 2009 – March 2016
Bekaert	industrial goods and services	BEKB	January 1993 – June 1999; December 1999 – March 2018
Bpost	Industrial Goods and Services	BPOST	March 2014 – March 2019
CBR	Cement	No longer listed	March 1991 – December 1999
Cofinimmo	Real Estate	No longer listed	January 2003 – March 2026
CMB	Shipowners	No longer listed	January 1993 – January 1999
CNP	Specialty finance	NAT	March 2006 – May 2011
Cockerill-Sambre	Steel	No longer listed	December 1994 – December 1996
Cobepa	Investment company	No longer listed	January 1999 – September 2000
Cumerio	Copper		2005
Delhaize Group	retail	AD	March 1991 – March 2017
Delta Lloyd	Insurance	DL	March 2013 – March 2016
Dexia	Banking	No longer listed	December 1997 – March 2012
D'Ieteren	Consumer services	DIE	July 1998 – March 2006; March 2012 – March 2016
Electrabel	Electricity	ELE	March 1991 – November 2005
Engie	Utilities	ENGI	November 2005 – March 2019
Galapagos	Health Care	GLPG	March 2016 – March 2025
Generale Bank	Banking	No longer listed	March 1991 – July 1998
GIB Group	Supermarkets	No longer listed	March 1991 – November 2002
IBA	Medical technology	No longer listed	November 1999 – March 2003
ING Group	Banks	INGA	March 2016 – March 2021
Mobistar	Telecom	OBEL	November 2002 – March 2013
Nyrstar	Metallurgy	NYR	March 2008 – March 2009; June 2011 – March 2013
Omega Pharma	Pharmaceuticals	OME	March 2002 – December 2011
Ontex Group	Personal and Household Goods	ONTEX	March 2016 – March 2020
Petrofina	Oil	No longer listed	March 1991 – June 1999
Real Software	Technology	No longer listed	June 1999 – February 2002
Recticel	Polyurethane based products	REC	March 1991 – January 1993
Royale Belge	Insurance	No longer listed	March 1991 – June 1998
Société Générale de Belgique	Investment & Banking	No longer listed	March 1991 – July 1998
Suez Environnement	Utility company		2008
Telindus	ICT	No longer listed	September 2000 – March 2002
Tessenderlo	Chemistry	TESB	March 1991 – January 1993; July 1998 – March 2004
ThromboGenics	Biopharmaceuticals	THR	March 2013 – March 2014
Tractebel	Energy	No longer listed	March 1991 – November 1999
