= Cumerio =

Cumerio S.A.
- Company type: Non-ferrous metallurgy
- Industry: Copper
- Predecessor: Copper activity division of Umicore
- Founded: 29 April 2005
- Defunct: 17 December 2008
- Fate: Acquired
- Successor: Aurubis after merge of Cumerio with Norddeutsche Affinerie AG (NA)
- Headquarters: Olen, Belgium
- Number of locations: Germany, Belgium, Bulgaria, Great Britain, Italy, Slovakia, and Switzerland
- Area served: Europe
- Key people: Luc Delagaye (CEO), Karel Vinck (Chairman of the Board of Directors)
- Products: Copper
- Services: Copper refining
- Revenue: € 3.329 million (2007)
- Net income: 46.3 million € (2007)
- Owner: merged with Norddeutsche Affinerie AG (NA), now named Aurubis
- Number of employees: 4 700
- Website: www.cumerio.com

On 17 December 2008, Cumerio and Norddeutsche Affinerie AG (NA) became Aurubis - Europe's biggest copper producer.

Cumerio was a copper refining company formed in 2005 by the division of the copper activity of Umicore. The Cumerio shares were first listed on Euronext Brussels on 29 April 2005, and delisted from Euronext Brussels on 17 December 2008 as a result of the squeeze-out after merging with Norddeutsche Affinerie AG.

Cumerio was active in smelting, refining and recycling of copper. The headquarters was located in Brussels. The production plants were located at:

- Pirdop (Bulgaria): refinery (smelter) for the production of copper anodes;
- Olen (Belgium): refinery (electrolysis) of high purity copper anodes / cathodes, and production of rolling thread;
- Avellino (Italy): production of wires and wire rods;
- Yverdon-les-Bains (Switzerland), Swiss Advanced Materials SA (SAM): production of complex profiles.

== Acquisition by Norddeutsche Affinerie AG ==
In June 2007, the German copper processor Norddeutsche Affinerie AG (NA) expressed its interest to take over Cumerio. On 23 January 2008 the European Commission accepted the transaction.

On 14 April 2008 Cumerio became part of the NA Group. This made it the largest copper producer in Europe.

== See also ==
- Umicore
- Union Minière du Haut Katanga
- Nyrstar
