= Walter van den Broeck =

Belgian writer and playwright (1941–2024)

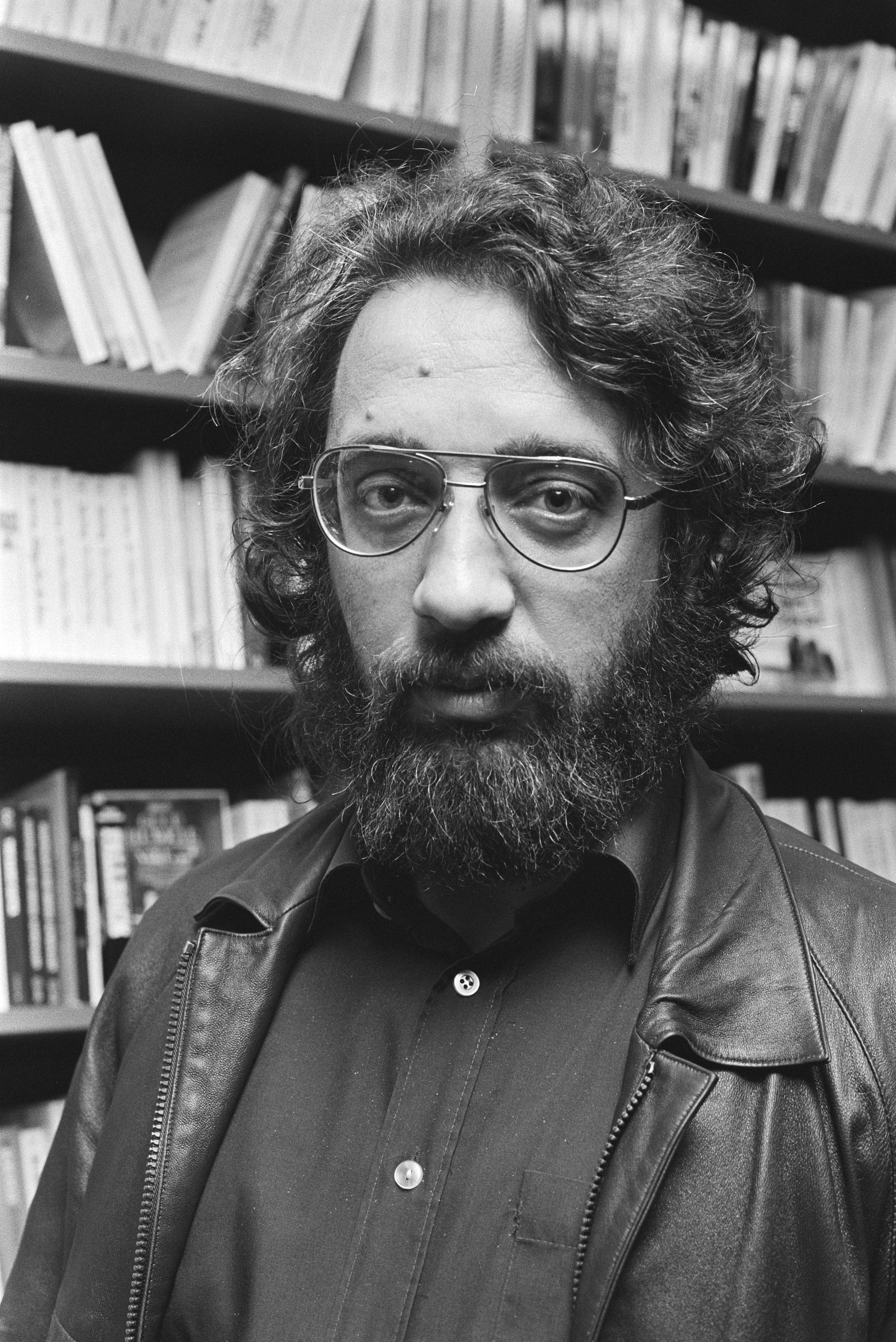
Van den Broeck in 1982

Walter Stefaan Karel van den Broeck (Olen 28 March 1941 – Turnhout 5 February 2024) was a Belgian writer and playwright. He graduated as a teacher in Dutch and History (Lier), and he started his career as a teacher.

== Life and career ==
Walter Stefaan Karel van den Broeck was born in Olen on 28 March 1941. In 1965, he founded the magazine Heibel with Frans Depeuter and Robin Hannelore. In 1974 he resigned as a teacher and became chief editor of Turnhout Ekspres, and from 1979 he was a member of the editorial team of the Nieuw Vlaams Tijdschrift.

Broeck became well known through his play Groenten uit Balen and the novel Brief aan Boudewijn, which was followed by the tetralogy Het beleg van Laken.

In 2010 he wrote the script for a comic book by Reinhart.

Broeck died in Turnhout on 5 February 2024, at the age of 82.

== Bibliography ==
- De troonopvolger (1967)
- Lang weekend (1968)
- 1 cola met 6 rietjes (1969)
- 362.880 x Jef Geys (1970)
- Mietje Porselein en Lili Spring-in-'t Veld (1970)
- Groenten uit Balen (1972)
- In beslag genomen. Een politiek-erotische satire (1972)
- Mazelen (1972)
- De dag dat Lester Saigon kwam (1974)
- Een andere Vermeer (1974)
- Greenwich (1974)
- Aantekeningen van een stambewaarder (1977)
- De rekening van het kind (1977)
- Het wemelbed (1978)
- Tot nut van 't Algemeen (1979)
- Brief aan Boudewijn (1980)
- Au bouillon belge (1981)
- Het beleg van Laken (1985)
- Aangewaaid (1986)
- ¡Querido hermano! (1988)
- Gek leven na het bal! (1989)
- Het proces Xhenceval (1990)
- Het gevallen baken (1991)
- Het leven na beklag (1992)
- Amanda en de widowmaker (1994)
- Verdwaalde post (1998)
- Een lichtgevoelige jongen (2001)
- Troïka voor spoken (met Frans Depeuter en Robin Hannelore, 1970)
- Tien jaar later (Nieuw Vlaams Tijdschrift-cahier, 1982)

== Awards ==
- 1972 - Beste kinderboek van de provincie Antwerpen
- 1973 - Letterkundige prijs van de provincie Antwerpen
- 1981 - Sabamprijs
- 1981 - Dirk Martens prijs
- 1982 - Henriëtte Roland Holst prijs
- 1982 - Driejaarlijkse Staatsprijs voor Toneel
- 1992 - Belgische Staatsprijs voor Vlaams verhalend proza

== See also ==
- Flemish literature
