= Montea (company) =

Montea NV
- Type: Naamloze vennootschap / Société anonyme
- Traded as: Euronext Brussels: AGS; BEL 20 component
- Industry: Real estate
- Predecessor: Warehouses De Pauw
- Founded: 1977
- Headquarters: Aalst, Belgium
- Revenue: €138.03 million (2024)
- Operating income: 185,574,000 (2025)
- Net income: €171.53 million (2024)
- Total assets: 3,261,957,000 (2025)
- Number of employees: 49 (2024)
- Website: www.montea.com

Montea NV is a publicly traded real estate company based in Aalst, Belgium, specializing in the development and management of logistics and industrial real estate. The company operates in Belgium, the Netherlands, France, and Germany and has a portfolio of more than 120 locations with a total area of over 2.3 million m².

== History ==
The history of Montea can be traced back to its founder, Pierre De Pauw, who recognized the potential of converting industrial brownfield sites into warehouse space. He spun off this division from the original company, Warehouses De Pauw. The company developed from a family business in Aalst into a listed company. It went public in 2006 on Euronext Brussels and Paris with a portfolio worth around 100 million euros at the time. Under the leadership of Dirk De Pauw (son of the founder) and CEO Jo De Wolf (since 2010), the company has experienced growth. The portfolio value reached over €3 billion in 2025. In March 2025, the company's shares were included in the Belgian benchmark index BEL 20.
