= Groenten uit Balen =

Groenten uit Balen may refer to:

- Groenten uit Balen (play), play by Walter van den Broeck
- Groenten uit Balen (film), 2011 Belgian film based on the play
