= Umicore =

Multinational materials technology company

Umicore SA
- Type: Public (S.A.)
- Traded as: Euronext Brussels: UMI; BEL 20 component
- ISIN: BE0974320526
- Industry: Metals and Mining
- Founded: 1989
- Headquarters: Brussels, Belgium
- Key people: Bart Sap (CEO); Thomas Leysen (Chairman)
- Products: Refining and management of precious metals, catalysts and other precious metal products, zinc chemicals and specialty materials, electro-optic and electronic materials
- Revenue: €3.6 billion (2025)
- Operating income: €579 million (2025)
- Net income: €288 million (2025)
- Total assets: €3.512 billion (end 2010)
- Total equity: €1.575 billion (end 2010)
- Number of employees: 10,224 (2018)
- Website: www.umicore.com

Umicore N.V., known as Union Minière before 2001, is a Belgian multinational materials technology company headquartered in Brussels, Belgium.

It was formed in 1989 by the merger of four companies in the mining and smelting industries, including the Union Minière known before 1968 as Union Minière du Haut Katanga. It has since reshaped itself into a more technology-focused business encompassing such areas as the refining and recycling of precious metals and the manufacture of specialised products from precious metals, cobalt, germanium, zinc, and other metals. The company has been a component of Belgium's benchmark BEL20 stock market index since its 1991 inception.

== History ==
=== Colonial origins ===
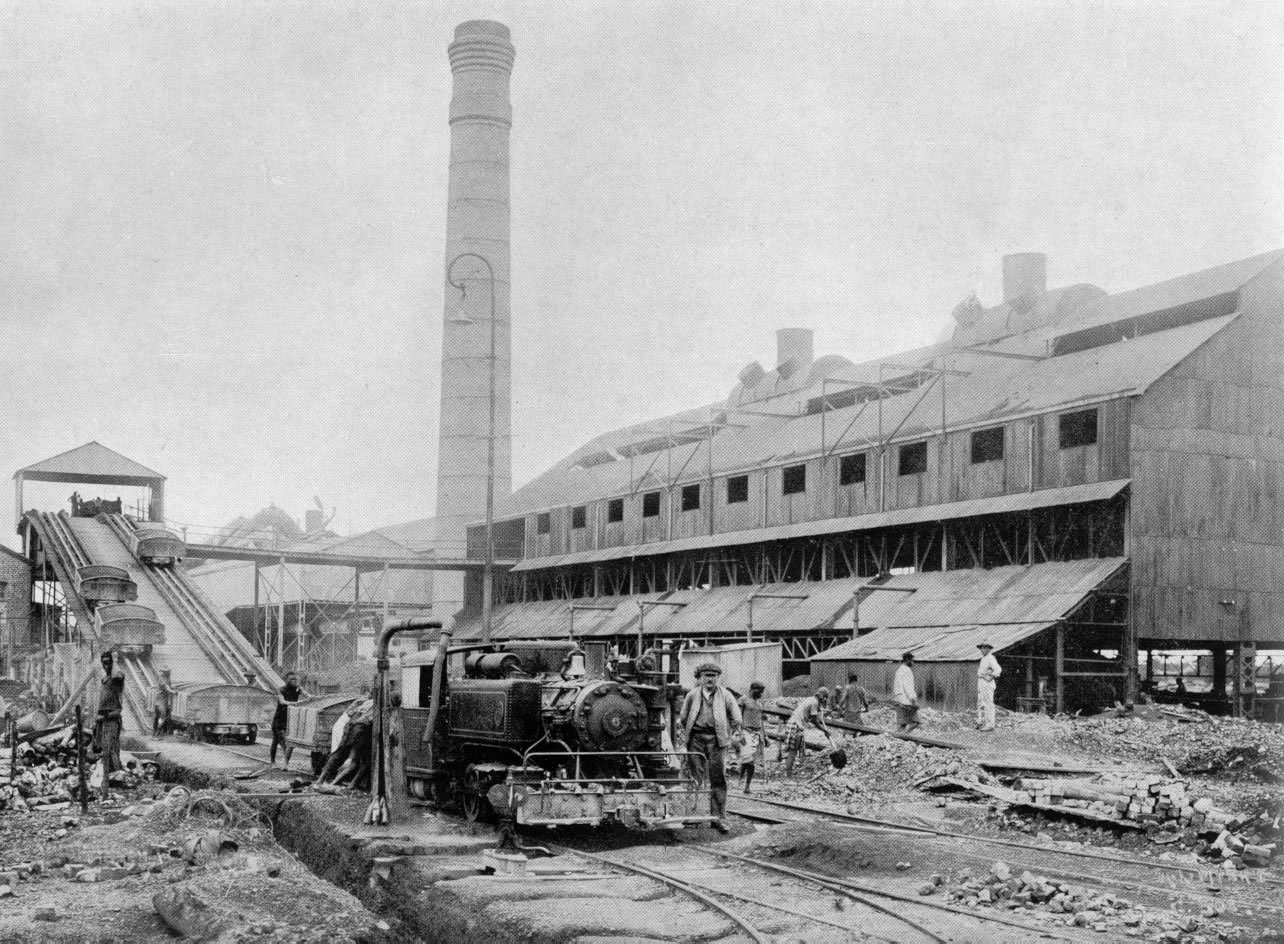
Factories operated by the Union Minière du Haut Katanga in Lubumbashi, Belgian Congo, 1917.

The main thread running through much of Umicore's history is the Union Minière du Haut-Katanga (UMHK), a company incorporated in 1906 to exploit the vast natural resources of the Congo Free State, later the Belgian Congo and now the Democratic Republic of the Congo. Initially, the UMHK concentrated on mining the state's extensive copper deposits, before diversifying into cobalt, tin, uranium (in which it at one point held a near-monopoly in global supply) and other precious metals. The company also constructed casting and smelting facilities, eventually growing to such an extent that it represented around half of all revenues taken in by the Congolese government. In early January 1967, the UMHK was nationalized by the regime of President Mobutu Sese Seko, and over $800 million of the company's assets were seized by the state.

=== After Katanga ===
The firm suddenly found itself without the vast majority of its business (despite later receiving financial compensation for the physical assets seized by Mobutu's regime) but managed to survive: full ownership passed to conglomerate Société Générale de Belgique, where it was grouped with its other metals and mining interests. As a reflection of its enforced departure from the Katanga Province, the new, simplified name Union Minière was adopted. With its more European focus, Union Minière began to grow its business again through the 1980s, initially largely organically. In 1989 however, Société Générale announced plans to merge Union Minière with three other Belgian metals companies in which it held a significant stake: zinc producer Vieille Montagne (with a history stretching back to 1805); Metallurgie Hoboken-Overpelt, which dealt in a wide range of metals including copper, cobalt, and lead; and Mechim, an engineering firm. The much enlarged company was initially renamed Acec-Union Minière (although the prefix was dropped in 1992) and subsequently set about streamlining its organisational structure, but the global economic downturn of the early-to-mid-1990s hit profits and forced management to implement a major restructuring programme in 1995. The three-year plan, implemented under the guidance of recently appointed CEO Karel Vinck, involved the loss of around 25% of Union Minière's workforce and the sale of a number of non-core assets, including a zinc wire operation, French roofing material retailer Asturienne and much of the company's exposure to the diamond products sector (including Diamant Boart).

== Operations ==
Umicore now "generates the majority of its revenues from clean technologies, such as recycling, emission control catalysts, materials for rechargeable batteries, and photovoltaics". It is ranked as one of The Global 100's "Most Sustainable Companies in the World"; in 2013 it was the top-ranked company and in 2014 it was in ninth place. In 2011, the company was awarded the Fray International Sustainability Award for developing breakthrough technologies for recycling lithium-ion batteries and establishing significant environmental protection initiatives.

Mining, originally the lifeblood of the company, no longer plays a direct part in the business: a minority stake in zinc producer Padaeng Industry, which operates a mine in the north of Thailand, was Umicore's last remaining presence in the sector and was sold in April 2008. Umicore's copper extraction and refining operations were divested in 2005, with its zinc refining operations following in 2007; these now form part of Aurubis and Nyrstar respectively.

=== Business divisions ===
The company divides its operations into four divisions: Energy Materials, Recycling, Catalysis, and Performance Materials.

==== Energy materials ====
The Energy Materials division manufactures a range of specialised metal and metalloid products for industrial use, including fine metal powders for diamond and hard metal tools, as well as oxides and salts of cobalt, lithium and nickel for use in batteries, glass and ceramics. The division also produces and markets products of germanium, both in compounds for doping optical fibres, semiconductor wafers and infrared optics. The unit is headquartered at the company's plant in Olen near Antwerp, with production and commercial facilities in a number of countries worldwide.

==== Recycling ====
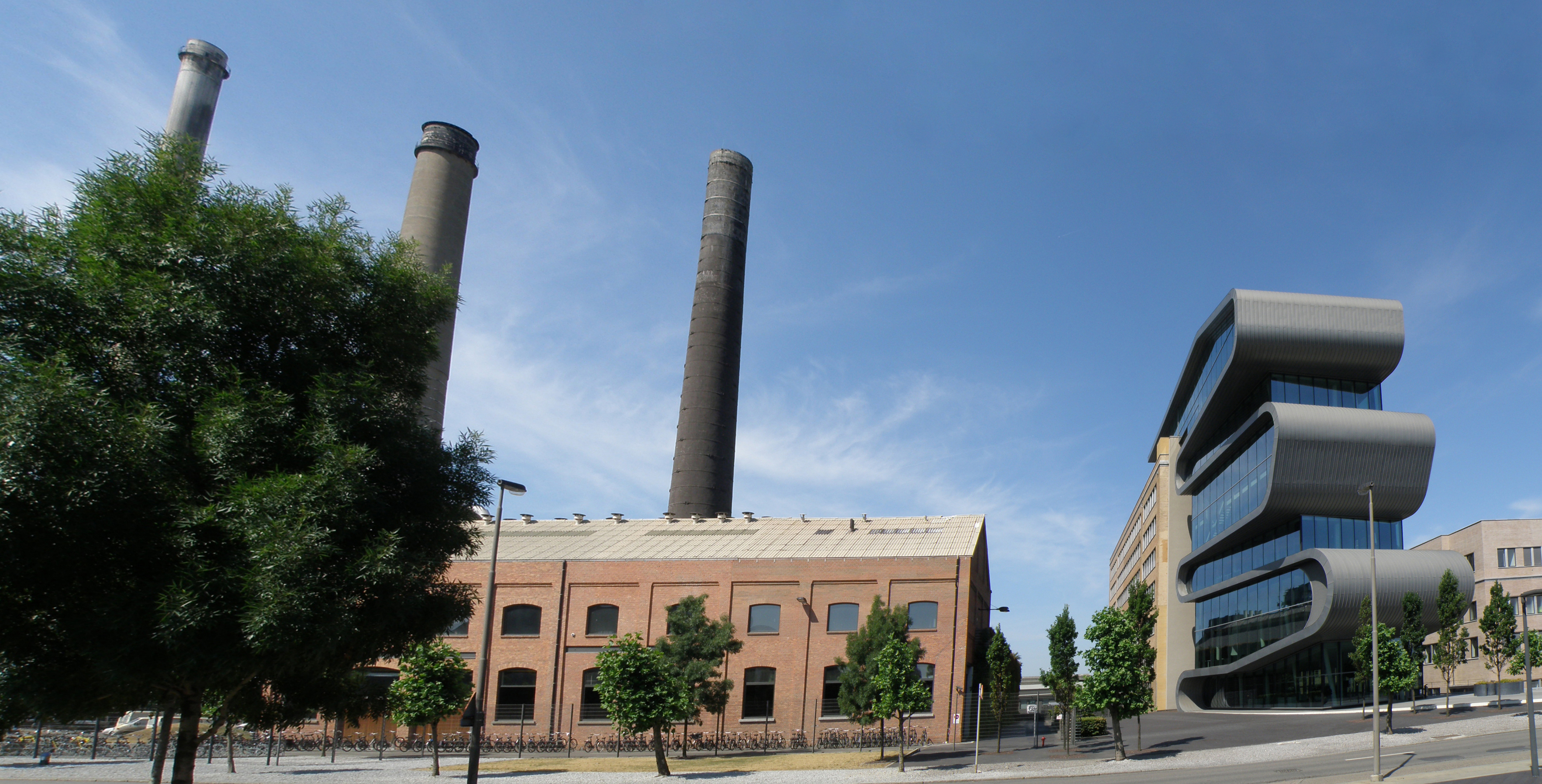
Umicore's precious metals facility in Hoboken, Belgium.

The Recycling business segment covers four main activities: its core business is the recycling and refining of various precious and other non-ferrous metals, as well as certain nonmetals such as selenium. Umicore is the world's largest recycler of precious metals. Most of the materials (around two-thirds in terms of refining charges) put through the refining process are by-products from the production of non-ferrous metals, such as dross, matte, and speiss from the zinc smelting industry and anode sludge built up during electrolysis. Other sources of materials used for recycling include slag, spent fuel cells, automotive and industrial catalysts and scrap electronic equipment. Production is headquartered at Umicore's precious metals facility in Hoboken near Antwerp, with other plants in Germany and the United States.

Battery Recycling is a second business unit, focused on the recycling of spent rechargeable batteries from laptops, mobile phones, and hybrid electric vehicles.

The Recycling segment, based in Hanau, Germany, also encompasses a management unit, which sells precious metals in ingot form to industrial clients and offers access to related financial instruments for hedging purposes.

==== Catalysis ====
Umicore's third business segment, its largest in terms of revenue, is composed of two subdivisions, Automotive Catalysts and Precious Metals Chemistry. In automotive catalysts, a field in which the company had begun research in 1968, the company ranks third in global market share behind BASF Catalysts (formerly Engelhard) and Johnson Matthey. Umicore increased its presence in the sector with the June 2007 purchase of the catalyst division of troubled American auto parts manufacturer Delphi for $55.6 million. Furthermore, Umicore went on to acquire Haldor Topsøe’s heavy-duty diesel and stationary catalyst businesses in 2017

==== Performance materials ====
Performance Materials concentrates on the production of specialised items, chiefly from precious metals and zinc. There are five business units:

- Building Products (the production of zinc-based items for the construction industry)
- Electroplating (organized in the daughter company Allgemeine Gold- und Silberscheideanstalt AG)
- Platinum Engineered Materials (platinum for the production of gauzes for fertilizer production and nitrous oxide abatement)
- Technical Materials (including alloys for brazing, metallic contacts for use in electrical engineering, various materials and components from platinum and materials for hermetic sealing and electronic packaging)
- Zinc Chemicals (zinc oxides and powders used for corrosion or ultraviolet radiation protection, such as Zano (ZnO))

It also comprises a 40% shareholding in Element Six Abrasives, a joint venture with De Beers.

== Financial information ==
Breakdown of Umicore's 2010 revenues by division.

Umicore N.V. financial results.
Year ended	Revenue (€ million)	Earnings before interest and taxes (€m)	Net profit (€m)	Earnings per share (€)
2010	2,000	324.0	248.7	2.20
2009	1,723	141.2	73.8	0.66
2008	2,124	247.7	222.5	1.06
2007	1,910	334.4	225.7	1.78
2006	1,685	313.6	218.3	1.70
2005	1,725	183.7	151.5	1.19
2004	1,693	269.5	174.3	1.36
2003	1,358	106.5	89.6	0.79

=== Shareholder structure ===
On 9 February 2011, five institutions had declared holdings of 3% or greater in Umicore: the company itself in treasury stock (6.19%), Fidelity International (6.75%), BlackRock (8.33%), Ameriprise Financial (3.00%) and Fidelity Management and Research (3.22%). The implied free float of the company is 100%.

== Sponsorship ==
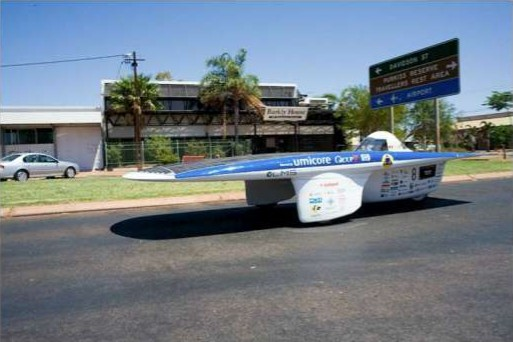
The Umicore-sponsored Umicar Infinity, participating in the 2007 World Solar Challenge.

The company serves as title sponsor of the Agoria Solar Team, the Leuven-based entrant in 2005, 2007 and 2009 editions of the World Solar Challenge, a solar-powered car race through the Australian Outback. The germanium substrates in the car's solar cells were also provided by Umicore. The team finished second in the 2007 race.

== See also ==
- Element Six, independently run company jointly owned by Umicore and De Beers
- Nyrstar, company spun off from the zinc and lead smelting assets of Umicore and Zinifex
