= LOCOPROL =

Satellite based train location system

LOCOPROL (Low Cost satellite based train location system for signalling and train Protection for Low density traffic railway lines) has been a project to research the integration of satellite navigation into railway networks targeting low-density track lines. It is supposed to extend the ERTMS train protection systems. The partner project LOCOLOC was looking into cab signaling and speed control measures.

== Foundation ==
Locoprol has its technical foundation in systems like Euteltrac / OmniTRACS from Qualcomm in use since 1991 for satellite-based fleet management followed by APOLO (Advanced Position Locator), ECORAIL (EGNOS Controlled Railway Equipment) and the parallel INTEGRAIL project (2001–2003) der ESA The LOCOPROL project was funded by the 5. Framework Programme of the EU just like the GADEROS project (GAlileo DEmonstrator Railway Operation System) starting at the same to research the integration of satellite navigation into the ERTMS standard (project partners were INECO, TIFSA, Railways Safety, ERRI, Aena, GMV Sistemas, Sener, NSL). The project was coordinated by Alstom.

== Project partners and related projects ==
The LOCOPROL project partners were Alstom (Belgium), Honeywell Regelsysteme Gmbh (Germany), INRETS (France), Alstom Transport (Italy), Trasys (Belgium), Alstom Transport (France), BPV (Germany), Septentrio (Belgium), Reseau Ferré de France (France), Société Nationale des Chemins de fer Belges (Belgium), Northern Jiaotong University (China), European Road Transport Telematics Implementation Coordination Organisation S.C.R.L. (Belgium).

The project did officially end in 2005 however it was continued in other projects building on its results. The ESA started in 2006 the project RUNE (Railway User Navigation Equipment) to use Galileo (satellite system) to create "virtual balises" and the projekt GEORAIL at the UIC continues to research satellite navigation in rail transport since 2004. the 6. Framework Programme of the EU contains GIRASOLE (accompanied by GPS-LOC of the SCNF), GRAIL and M-TRADE which ran until 2007. In England LOCASYS project was started continuing the LOCOPROL project with a target on dependability until 2009. In Belgium the LOCOPROL pilot railway track was extended in the TransLogisTIC project between 2007 and 2009 looking into integration of railway and classic fleet management. The actual usage of satellite navigation in railway systems can be currently found systems like the Tr@in-MD of SCNF for dangerous goods wagons traceability and Gédéon of SCNF for tracking of freight.

== Results ==
The results of the LOCOLOC/LOCOPROL project have shown that satellite navigation in urban areas is highly restricted by satellites in range. The project has developed algorithms to map satellite signals to a 1D flat track map that allows to check the position even with only two satellites in range (from 6 satellites required for a safe EGNOS measurement it allows 3 failures and in some cases 4 failures). Still the results have not been able to meet SIL4 safety of life boundaries (with 98% of measures successful outside tunnels) however the test model had not been conclusive regarding dependability on all system conditions. The results indicate so far that passive (fixed data) balises are necessary in the vicinity of railway stations to counter the lack of accuracy of the satellite train positioning.

== Potential re-evaluation ==
As EGNOS certification for safety of life applications will be achieved in 2010 the LOCOPROL results may be re-evaluated with the system running in a non-prototype environment. In comparison, the North American Joint Positive Train Control system is testing with two Differential GPS receivers combined with an inertial navigation system for dead reckoning in areas with not enough satellites in sight. The Italian Ansaldo STS has developed a train control system based Russian entwickelte KLUB-U safety systems - the ITARUS-ATC takes advantage of satellite navigation in combination with an inertial navigation system and wheel sensors to measure the travel distance reaching a safety level ready for passenger transport in Russia - it will be deployed on the track to Sotchi up to the winter games 2014.
