= European Rail Traffic Management System =

Standards for railway signalling

- ERTMS logo
- Formation: 1998/1999
- Website: http://www.ertms.net/

The European Rail Traffic Management System (ERTMS) is the system of standards for management and interoperation of signalling for railways by the European Union (EU). It is conducted by the European Union Agency for Railways (ERA) and is the organisational umbrella for the separately managed parts of

- GSM–R (communication),
- European Train Control System (ETCS, signalling),

The main target of ERTMS is to promote the interoperability of trains in the EU. It aims to greatly enhance safety, increase efficiency of train transports and enhance cross-border interoperability of rail transport in Europe. This is done by replacing former national signalling equipment and operational procedures with a single new Europe-wide standard for train control and command systems.

== History ==
In the mid-1980s, the International Union of Railways (UIC) and the European Rail Research Institute (ERRI) began the search for a common European operation management for railways, titled ERTMS. Today the development of ERTMS is steered by the ERA and driven by the Association of the European Rail Industry (UNIFE, Union des Industries Ferroviaires Européennes).

Until this effort began, there were (for historical reasons in each national railway system) in Europe:

- More than 20 different train protection systems,
- Different, conflicting rail operating rules,
- Different national homologation rules for vehicles,
- Different accreditation rules for drivers,
- Five different railway electrification systems,
- Missing, different or inoperable communication systems to driver cabs,
- Different national languages,
- Different measuring systems (Metric System, Imperial units),
- Right- and left-hand traffic organisation,
- Rail gauge differences on main lines in peripheral countries (Iberian Peninsula, Ireland, Russian broad gauge),
- Different railway coupling mechanisms by countries or rolling stock type,

all influencing train communication in parts.

To illustrate this, long running trains like Eurostar or Thalys must have 6 to 8 different train protection systems.

Technical targets of ERTMS are:

- Creation of an unified, standardised European train protection system to enhance interoperability and to quickly replace outdated systems,
- Unifying and enhancement of driver cab signalling,
- Market enhancement for control- and management systems; with better choices for customers, lower prices in mass production and export possibilities for worldwide application,
- Generation of equal security levels in train operation with comparable rules.

In 1995 a development plan first mentioned the creation of the European Rail Traffic Management System. In 1996 the first specification for ETCS followed in response to EU Council Directive 96/48/EC99 on interoperability of the trans-European high-speed rail system.

The functional specification of ETCS was announced In April 2000 as guidelines for implementation in Madrid. In autumn 2000 the member states of EU voted for publication of this specifications as decision of the European Commission to get a preliminary security in law and planning. This was to give the foundation for testing applications in six member railways of the ERTMS Users Group.

In 2002 the Union of Signalling Industry (UNISIG) published the SUBSET-026 defining the current implementation of ETCS signalling equipment together with GSM–R – this Class 1 SRS 2.2.2 (now called ETCS Baseline 2) was accepted by the European Commission in decision 2002/731/EEC as mandatory for high-speed rail and in decision 2004/50/EEC as mandatory for conventional rail.

In 2004 further development stalled. While some countries (Austria, Spain, Switzerland) switched to ETCS with some benefit, German and French railway operators had already introduced proven and modern types of domestic train protection systems for high speed traffic, so they would gain no benefit. Furthermore, the introduction of ETCS Level 1 (such as in Spain) proved to be expensive and nearly all implementations are delayed. The defined standards were comprehensive by political nature, but not exact in technical means. National rail authorities often had certain features or constraints in their existing system they did not want to lose, and since every authority was still required to approve the systems, dialects of ERTMS emerged. Some active players were willing to overcome the situation with a new Baseline definition, not suited for immediate action.

This situation shifted the focus more onto the technical parts of ETCS and GSM-R as universal technical foundations of ERTMS. To master this situation, Karel Vinck was appointed in July 2005 as EU coordinator.

In 2005 a Memorandum of Understanding on ERTMS was published by members of the European Commission, national railways and supplying industries in Brussels. According to this declaration ETCS was to be introduced in 10 to 12 years on a named part of the Trans-European Networks. Following this a conference was held in April 2006 in Budapest for the introduction of ERTMS, attended by 700 people.

In July 2009, the European Commission announced that ETCS is now mandatory for all EU funded projects which include new or upgraded signalling and GSM-R is required when radio communications are upgraded.

In April 2012 at the UIC ERTMS World Conference in Stockholm, Sweden, the executive director of the Community of European Railway and Infrastructure Companies (CER) called for an accelerated implementation of ERTMS in Europe.

After definition of ETCS Baseline 3 in about 2010 and starting of implementation in multiple countries with Baseline 3 Release 2 in summer 2016, it is again possible to direct attention to operational management requirements of payloads. Logistics companies like DB Cargo have the need to develop functional capabilities in the target scope of ETML, which should be welcome for standardisation.

== ERTMS implementation strategies ==
The deployment of the European Rail Traffic Management System means the installation of ETCS components on the lineside of the railways and the train borne equipment. Both parts are connected by GSM-R as the communication part. Various railway roll out strategies can be used. With the introduction of ETCS the infrastructure manager has to decide whether a line will be equipped only with ETCS or if there is a demand for a mixed signalling system with support for National Train Control (NTC). Currently, both 'clean' and mixed systems are being deployed in Europe and around the world.

=== 'Clean' ETCS operation ===
Many new ETCS lines in Europe are being created and then it may often be preferred to implement ETCS Level 1 or Level 2 only. With this implementation strategy the wayside signalling cost is kept to a minimum, but the vehicle fleet that operates on these lines will need to all be equipped with ETCS on board to allow operation. This is more suitable for new high-speed passenger lines, where new vehicles will be bought, less suitable if long-distance freight trains shall use it. Examples of 'clean' ETCS operation include HSL-Zuid in the Netherlands, TP Ferro international stretch (Sección Internacional / Section Internationale) Figueres [ES] – Perpignan [FR], Erfurt–Halle/Leipzig in Germany, among others. Also all ETCS railways in Sweden and Norway, since the ETCS and ATC balise frequencies are too close so that older trains would get faults when passing Eurobalises.

=== Mixed operation ===
Mixed operation is a strategy where the wayside signalling is equipped with both ETCS and a conventional Class B system. Often the conventional system is the legacy system used during the signalling upgrade program. The main purposes of introducing a mixed operation (mixed signalling system) are:

- For financial and operational reasons, it is impossible to install ETCS for the complete network in a short period.
- Not every train is equipped to run on ETCS lines and ETCS-equipped trains cannot run only on new lines.
- Having a fall-back solution minimises the risk to the operation.

With mixed operation it is possible to run a line with both conventional and ETCS trains and to use the advantages of ETCS technology for the trains so equipped (e.g. higher speed or more trains on the line) but with the benefit that it is not necessary to equip the whole train fleet with ETCS simultaneously. Examples of ETCS in mixed operation include HSL 3 in Belgium where ETCS is mixed with national ATP system TBL or High-Speed Line Cordoba-Malaga in Spain where ETCS is mixed with NTC of ASFA and LZB.

Operational principle of ETCS in mixed operation: NTC and ETCS Level 2

The principle of mixed level signalling is based on simple principles using bi-directional data exchange between the Radio Block Centre (RBC) and the interlocking systems. The operator sets a route and does not need to know if the route will be used for a Level NTC (former LSTM) only or a Level 2-equipped train. A route is locked based on the national principles by the interlocking system and the RBC is informed about the routes set. The RBC checks whether it is possible to allocate a train to the route and then informs the interlocking system that a train is allocated to the route. The interlocking system may show the ETCS white bar aspect to signals at the ETCS Border or along the ERTMS-route. Depending on the implementation, NTC systems along the route may or may not be active.

Movement Authority (MA) is the permission for a train to move to a specific location within the constraints of the infrastructure and with supervision of speed. End of movement Authority (EoA) is the location to which the train is permitted to proceed and where target speed is equal to zero. End of movement Authority is the location to which the train is permitted to proceed according to a MA. When transmitting a MA, it is the end of the last section given in the MA.

The RBC sends a Movement Authority (MA) to the train if a Level 2 train is allocated to the route. Otherwise the signal shows the optical proceed aspect and the related NTC code is sent to the track. As soon as a Level 2 train reports itself in rear of a route currently assigned for optical authorisation (e.g. after Start Of Mission (SOM) procedure or when the driver changes level from Level NTC to Level 2), the optical authorisation is automatically upgraded to a Level 2 movement authority. Consequently, a Level 2 movement authority is downgraded to an optical authorisation after a predefined time-out if the driver closes the cab or a fault is detected that restricts the movement authority (e.g. if the GSM-R radio coverage is unavailable.)

== See also ==
- European Rail Traffic Management System in Great Britain
- European Union Agency for Railways (formerly ERA)
- Positive Train Control
- LOCOPROL
- UNIFE
