= Union des Industries Ferroviaires Européennes =

European rail supply industry trade group

UNIFE
- Type: Industry trade group
- Industry: Rail Supply Industry
- Founded: 1991
- Headquarters: Rue de la Science 14A, B - 1040 Brussels, Belgium, Belgium
- Key people: Enno Wiebe, Director General; Martin Sion, UNIFE Chair
- Number of employees: 25
- Website: www.unife.org www.linkedin.com/company/unife-the-european-rail-industry/mycompany/ x.com/UNIFE www.youtube.com/@UNIFE_Rail/videos

UNIFE (French: Union des Industries Ferroviaires Européennes), or The European Rail Supply Industry Association, is an association of Europe's rail supply companies active in the design, manufacture, maintenance and refurbishment of rail transport systems, subsystems and related equipment. UNIFE also brings together 12 national rail industry associations of European countries. UNIFE is a member of the Group of Representative Bodies.

UNIFE is also the administrator, jointly with CER, of the European Railway Award which honours outstanding political and technical achievements in the development of economically and environmentally sustainable rail transport.

== Structure and Governance ==
UNIFE is chaired by the Presiding Board, which is composed of members and is the highest ranked UNIFE Committee.

The Presiding Board takes any measures or actions required for the achievement of the mission and objectives of UNIFE and its general policy, such creating sub-committees and working groups handling issues of common interest to the members. It is composed of key executives and directors from companies within the European Rail Supply Industry.

== European Rail Supply Industry ==
UNIFE’s companies, which compose the European Rail Supply Industry, deliver products and other related services for Europe’s extensive railway systems.

The European Rail Supply Industry also employs approx. 400,000 people, and supports a range of other supply chains throughout Europe. UNIFE members, account for 84% of the European and 46% of the global markets for rail equipment and services, and are active in the design, manufacturing, maintenance and refurbishment of rail transport systems, subsystems and related equipment worldwide.

== UNIFE Priorities 2024 – 2029: "On the Move to a Net-Zero EU" ==
In March 2024, UNIFE delivered its priorities document "On the Move to a Net-Zero EU" for the 2024-2029 mandate of the European Union.

=== Policy Priorities ===
1) Foster a rail sector and upscaled, competitive European Rail Supply Industry to ensure the success of EU net-zero policies.

2) Enact an ambitious EU budget and increased private financing for rail during the next Multiannual Financial Framework to achieve the objectives defined, secure major priorities (ERTMS, DAC, FRMCS deployment), and finance new rolling stock.

3) Highlight legislative efforts on carbon neutrality, avoid the pitfalls of horizon legislation, acknowledging the specificities of rail, while achieving a simplified and more predictable regulatory framework.

=== Skills ===
The European rail supply industry faces several challenges related to skills, ranging from an aging workforce to, while also promoting the industry as more dynamic than it currently is perceived as a strategy to attract young people, women and those seeking a change in careers. As part of this, UNIFE is engaged in a range of programs such as RailStaffer and A Woman's Place is in Rail!, as a centerpiece of its strategy to reduce skills shortages.

=== Gender Equity ===
The association announced its Gender Equity Policy during its 2022 General Assembly in Paris. The policy reiterates the need to address continuing imbalances within the European rail sector. It also highlights working conditions that limit the full participation of women and non-males.

Seeking to lead by example, the policy presents internal actions that UNIFE will take to ensure that it remains a champion on the matter, such as establishing the UNIFE Gender Equity Advisory Group to examine this issue with a sectoral perspective and promoting representation by no longer participating in or organising “manels” (i.e. male dominated panels).

== World Rail Market Study ==
The UNIFE World Rail Market Study is the leading reference on the global rail supply market. Produced biennially, it is considered a source and report on the growth of the current rail market, as well as a forecast of the future demand for rail supplies.

== UNIFE Responsibilities ==
UNIFE, on top of its advocacy for the European Rail Supply Industry, manages key programs which are relevant to its activities as an organisation.

=== IRIS ===
Established as a UNIFE working group in 2005, IRIS Certification aims to secure higher quality in the rail sector through developing and implementing a global system for the evaluation of companies supplying to the railway industry.

IRIS Certification is modelled on similar quality standards already in place in the aerospace, and automotive industries.

=== ERTMS ===
The European Railway Traffic Management System (ERTMS) is a major industrial project developed by a group of UNIFE members – Alstom Transport, AZD Praha, CAF, Hitachi Rail STS, Mermec and Siemens Mobility – in close cooperation with the European Union, railway stakeholders and the GSM-R industry.

ERTMS is intended to replace the separate national train control and command systems in Europe, with the stated goal of increasing the performance of European railways.

=== Hop On Rail! ===
UNIFE’s 'Hop On Rail!' campaign is an initiative from the European rail supply industry to promote Europe’s potential tech and green future opportunities which can be developed through the rail sector. Further to this, the campaign is designed to explain and advocate the benefits to younger people of working in the European rail supply industry.

== Participating Programs ==
=== STAFFER ===
The Skill Training Alliance For the Future European Rail system (STAFFER) is the rail sector’s Erasmus+ Blueprint for Sectoral Cooperation on Skills. Coordinated by the University of Genoa, this 4-year EU-funded project brings together 32 partners representing academics, trainers, authorities, operators and suppliers to assess Europe’s current academic and vocational training programmes, craft reforms, help implement their recommendations to make the rail sector more attractive to current and future employees.

As a member of the consortium undertaking the project, UNIFE is an active member of STAFFER activities.

=== ERRAC ===
The European Rail Research Advisory Council (ERRAC) is a European Technology Platform (ETP) established in 2001 to serve as a single European body to help revitalise the EU’s rail sector by fostering increased innovation and guiding research efforts at European level.

The council comprises 45 representatives from both the sector and outside of it, such as manufacturers, operators, infrastructure managers, the European Commission, EU Member States, academics and users’ groups. UNIFE remains an active member of ERRAC.

=== Rail Forum Europe ===
Rail Forum Europe (RFE) is the Members of the European Parliament association dedicated to rail transport. Created in 2011, the Association aims to facilitate the establishment or strengthening of professional and personal ties between its members in full compliance with European and National Law, as well as to foster the co-operation with various scientific, technical, economic, industrial and professional groups and organisations – whose activities affect the various issues that arise in the field of rail transport. UNIFE is an active participant and facilitator of Rail Forum Europe meetings.
