= GADEROS =

GADEROS (Galileo Demonstrator for Railway Operation System) is a study sponsored by the European Commission with the purpose to make use of the Galileo Global Navigation Satellite System (GNSS) when it becomes functional in 2008.

Current terrestrial railroad tracking systems require huge distances as safety margins. This leads to lower freight and passenger throughput.

== See also ==
- LOCOPROL
