= Heinrich Wohlwill =

- Born: 7 February 1874; Hamburg, Germany
- Died: 31 January 1943 (aged 68); Terezín, Czechoslovakia
- Father: Emil Wohlwill

Heinrich Wohlwill (7 February 1874 – 31 January 1943) was a German-Jewish engineer of electrochemistry.

== Early life ==
Wohlwill was born in Hamburg, in the German Empire, on 7 February 1874, the third of five children of well-known engineer of electrochemistry, Emil Wohlwill. Heinrich Wohlwill had two older siblings: Marie Wohlwill and Sophie Wohlwill, and two younger siblings: Gretchen Wohlwill and Joachim Friedrich Wohlwill. Heinrich Wohlwill served as the technical director of Norddeutsche Affinerie and as a member of the board until he was removed from the company, due to the Jewish discrimination in Germany.

== Patent ==
Wohlwill invented an industrial process for recovering copper, which was in used until WWII. The patent resulted in the formation of Norddeutsche Affinerie, presently Aurubis AG. He improved upon the Wohlwill process (having previously been invented by his father in 1910), which is the method for extracting pure gold and silver throughout industry with the use of electrochemical electrolysis

== Death ==
Wohlwill received the deportation letter in Hamburg on 17 July 1942, during the widespread Jewish discrimination in Germany during the Holocaust. Three days later, on 20 July 1942, Wohlwill and his wife Henriette Wohlwill were deported to the Theresienstadt concentration camp in Terezín. On 31 January 1943, Wohlwill died during his placement in Theresienstadt camp.
