= Community of European Railway and Infrastructure Companies =

Community of European Railway and Infrastructure Companies (CER)
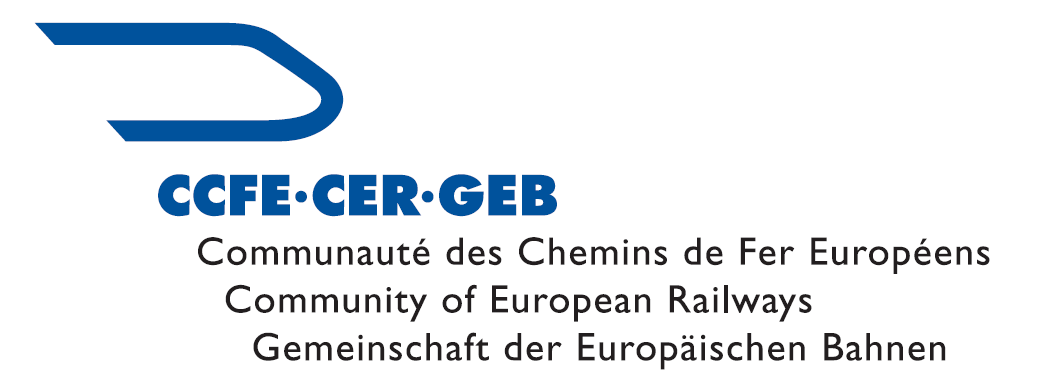
- Formation: 1988
- Type: Sector association
- Purpose: To represent the common interests of the railway companies and infrastructure managers at European level
- Headquarters: 53 Avenue des Arts; 1000 Brussels, Belgium
- Location: Brussels, Belgium
- Region served: Europe
- Members: Railway and infrastructure companies
- Official language: English
- President: Andreas Matthä (ÖBB)
- Executive Director: Alberto Mazzola
- Website: www.cer.be

The Community of European Railway and Infrastructure Companies (CER) brings together 75 railway undertakings and infrastructure companies from the European Union, the candidate countries (North Macedonia and Turkey) as well as from the Western Balkan countries, Norway, and Switzerland.

The CER is also a member of the Group of Representative Bodies.

== Purpose ==
It is based in Brussels and represents its members’ interests vis-à-vis the European Parliament, European Commission and European Council of Ministers as well as other policy makers and transport actors.

The CER's main focus is promoting the development of rail as essential to the creation of a sustainable transport system which is both efficient and environmentally sound. A key priority in this respect for the CER is the achievement of a more balanced modal split in the transport system, minimising external costs arising to society and improving economic efficiency. In parallel to the railways’ own initiatives for improving the quality of rail services, the CER sees ensuring sufficient investment in infrastructure rail projects as a prerequisite for achieving the desire modal split.

== Areas of Interest ==
All policy areas of significance to railway transport are dealt with by the CER, which offers advice and recommendations to European policy makers. The CER monitors and contributes to railway policy making. Its interests span the whole spectrum of European transport policy: infrastructure planning, passenger and freight services, public service, the environment, research and development and social dialogue.

== Members ==
Current members
| Country | Company | Acronym |
|---|---|---|
| Albania | Hekurudha Shqiptare | HS |
| Austria | Österreichische Bundesbahnen | ÖBB |
| | Salzburger Lokalbahn | SLB |
| | Wiener Lokalbahnen | WLC |
| Belgium | Nationale Maatschappij der Belgische Spoorwegen/ Société Nationale des Chemins de fer Belges | NMBS; SNCB |
| | SNCB Holding / NMBS Holding | |
| Bosnia and Herzegovina | Željeznice Federacije Bosne i Hercegovine | ŽFBH |
| | Željeznice Republike Srpske | ŽRS |
| Bulgaria | Balgarski daržavni železnitsi | BDŽ |
| | Balgarska Schelesnopatna Kompania | BRC |
| | National Railway Infrastructure Company | |
| Croatia | HŽ Putnički prijevoz | HŽPP |
| | HŽ Infrastruktura | HŽI |
| Czech Republic | České dráhy | ČD |
| | Správa železnični dopravní cesty | SŽDC |
| Denmark | Danske Statsbaner | DSB |
| | Railion Danmark | |
| Estonia | Aktsiaselts Eesti Raudtee | AER |
| Finland | VR-Yhtymä Oy | VR |
| France | Société nationale des chemins de fer français | SNCF |
| | Thalys | |
| | Veolia Transport | |
| Germany | Deutsche Bahn AG | DB |
| | TX Logistik | |
| Greece | Organismos Sidirodromon Ellados | OSE |
| Ireland | Iarnród Éireann | CIE |
| Italy | Ferrovie dello Stato SpA | FS |
| Hungary | Central European Railway Transport, Trading and Service Co. | CER |
| | Magyar Államvasutak | MÁV |
| | MÁV Cargo | |
| | MÁV-START | |
| | Magyar Vasúti Egyesülés (Hungarian Railway Association) | |
| | Raaberbahn AG / GYSEV Zrt. | GySEV |
| | Vasúti Pályakapacitás-elosztó Kft. (EIU) | VPE |
| Latvia | Baltijas Ekspresis | |
| | Latvijas Dzelzceļš | LDZ |
| Lithuania | Lietuvos Geležinkeliai | LG |
| Luxembourg | Chemins de fer luxembourgeois | CFL |
| | CFL Cargo | |
| Moldova | Calea Ferată din Moldova | CFM |
| Montenegro | Željeznica Crne Gore | ŽCG |
| Netherlands | Nederlandse Spoorwegen | NS |
| | Railion Nederland | |
| North Macedonia | Makedonski Železnici Infrastructure (EIU) | RFYMI |
| | Makedonski Železnici Transport (EVU) | RFYMT |
| Norway | Vy | VY |
| Poland | CTL Logistics | CTL |
| | Polskie Koleje Państwowe | PKP |
| | Rail Polska | |
| Portugal | Comboios de Portugal | CP |
| Romania | CFR Calatori | CFR |
| | CFR Marfa | CFR |
| | Compania Nationala de Cai Ferate SA | CFR |
| | Grup Feroviar Român | GFR |
| | S.C. Regiotrans | RT |
| | Servtrans Invest | |
| Sweden | Branschföreningen Tågoperatörerna | |
| Switzerland | BLS AG | BLS |
| | Eurofima | |
| | Schweizerische Bundesbahnen | SBB |
| | Swiss capacity allocation body | TVS |
| Serbia | Železnice Srbije | |
| Slovakia | Bratislavská regionálna koľajová spoločnosť | BRKS |
| | Železnice Slovenskej Republiky (EIU) | ŽSR |
| | Železničná spoločnosť Slovensko | ŽSSK |
| | Železničná spoločnosť Cargo Slovakia | ŽSSK Cargo |
| Slovenia | Slovenske železnice | SŽ |
| Spain | Administrador de Infraestructuras Ferroviarias | ADIF |
| | Renfe Operadora | RENFE |
| Turkey | Türkiye Cumhuriyeti Devlet Demiryolları | TCDD |
| United Kingdom | Alpha Trains | |
| | Rail Delivery Group | RDG |
| | DB Cargo UK | |
| | Eurostar International | |

== See also ==
- The European Railway Award
