= Karel Vinck =

Belgian businessman

- Born: September 19, 1938 (age 87); Belgian
- Education: Katholieke Universiteit Leuven (MSc), Cornell University (MBA)
- Occupation: Businessman
- Employer(s): Eternit, Bekaert N.V., Union Minière
- Known for: Manager of the Year (1994), restructuring Union Minière
- Title: Co-ordinator of ERTMS (European Commission), Chairman of Cumerio
- Board member of: Suez-Tractebel, Tessenderlo Group, KU Leuven, Théâtre Royal de la Monnaie
- Honors: Honorary Chairman of VEV, Chairman of Flemish Science Policy Council

Karel Vinck (born 19 September 1938) is a Belgian businessman. In 1994 the readers of the weekly business magazine Trends chose him to be the Manager of the year. He graduated as a Master in Electrical and Mechanical Engineering from the Katholieke Universiteit Leuven (Leuven, Belgium) and got an MBA from Cornell University (Ithaca, New York, United States).

== Career ==
He started his career at Eternit. Afterwards Karel Vinck was director of Bekaert N.V from 1985 up to 1994. In 1995, he started working for Union Minière, where he led the restructuring of the company.

He is also a member of the Board of Suez-Tractebel, Tessenderlo Group, of the Katholieke Universiteit Leuven and of the Théâtre Royal de la Monnaie. He is Co-ordinator of the European Rail Traffic Management System (ERTMS) with the European Commission, and chairman of Cumerio. Karel Vinck is honorary chairman of the Flemish employers association (VEV), and Chairman of the Flemish Science Policy Council.

== Sources ==
- Karel Vinck (Umicore)
