= Aurubis =

Second largest producer of copper in the world

Aurubis AG

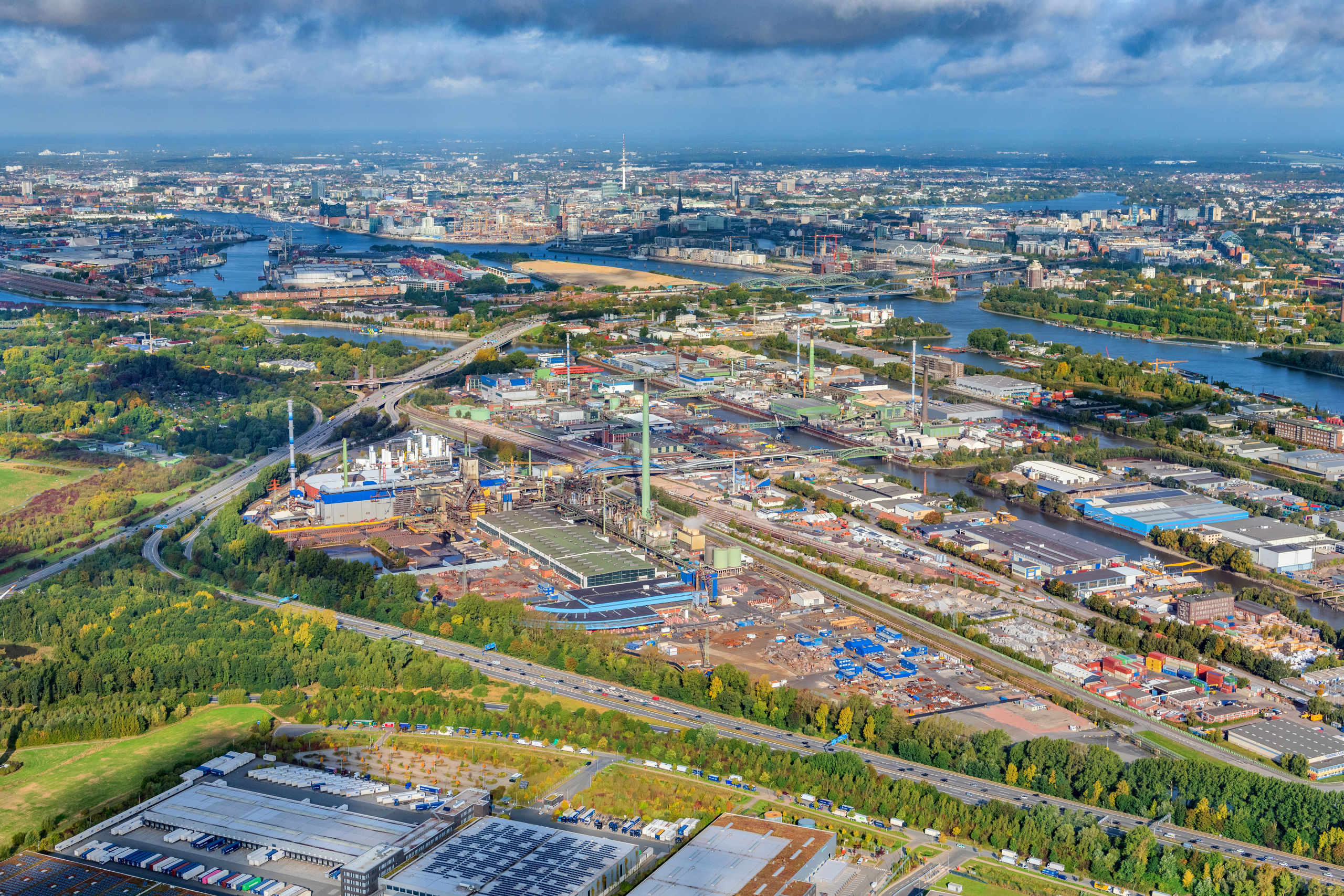
- Aerial view of the Aurubis plant in Hamburg (2022)
- Type: Aktiengesellschaft
- Traded as: FWB: NDA1; MDAX
- Industry: Metals, Metallurgy
- Predecessor: Norddeutsche Affinerie
- Founded: 1866 (as Norddeutsche Affinerie AG until 2009)
- Headquarters: Hamburg, Germany
- Area served: Europe, USA, Asia
- Key people: Toralf Haag (CEO), Fritz Vahrenholt (Chairman of the supervisory board)
- Products: Copper extraction, recycling of copper and precious metals, manufactured copper products
- Revenue: € 18.2 billion (2024/2025)
- Number of employees: 7,190 (September 30, 2025)
- Website: Aurubis.com

Aurubis AG (formerly Norddeutsche Affinerie AG) is a global supplier of non-ferrous metals and one of the world's largest copper recyclers. The company processes complex metal concentrates, scrap, organic and inorganic metal-bearing recycling materials, and industrial residues into metals. Aurubis produces a variety of copper products, such as wire rods, continuous cast shapes, profiles, and flat rolled products. Aurubis also produces a range of other metals, including precious metals such as selenium, lead, nickel, tin, and zinc. The portfolio includes other products, such as sulfuric acid and iron silicate.

Aurubis has about 7,000 employees, European and USA production sites, and a worldwide sales network. Its shares are listed in the Prime Standard Segment of the German Stock Exchange, the MDAX, the Global Challenges Index (GCX), and the STOXX Europe 600.

== History ==
=== Origins and development up to World War I ===
The historical roots of Aurubis go back to 1770. The predecessor of Aurubis initially smelted coins and precious metal alloys. After the occupation of the then precious metal trading center Amsterdam in 1795, the company benefited from the tense situation on the precious metal market before it was also blocked by French occupiers due to the occupation of Hamburg in 1806.

From around 1830, Hamburg shipowners began to bring copper ore back from North and South America on the return voyages of their emigrant ships, creating a lucrative market. Over time, production shifted to the smelting of ores.

After the great fire of Hamburg (1842), demand for metals rose again, especially for copper as a non-combustible building material, for example for roofs. In 1846, Joh. Ces. Godeffroy & Sohn acquired a stake in Beit, Marcus und Salomon, Gold- und Silberscheider, the forerunner of Aurubis. The joint company was called Elbkupferwerk. An economic upswing led to the founding of Elbhütten-Affinier- und Handelsgesellschaft in 1856, whereby the Elbkupferwerk and Beit's main plant were merged. Around 1860, the new company accounted for more than 50% of total German copper production with around 3000 tons per year. From 1857 to 1864/1865, due to collapsing demand, falling metal prices and declining ore returns, the plant's activities were first successively curtailed and finally shut down completely. Together with Norddeutsche Bank, a consortium led by Ferdinand Beit founded Norddeutsche Affinerie AG on April 28, 1866 and took over the now closed Beit's maint plant. Norddeutsche Bank was the main shareholder of the new company with 75% of the shares.

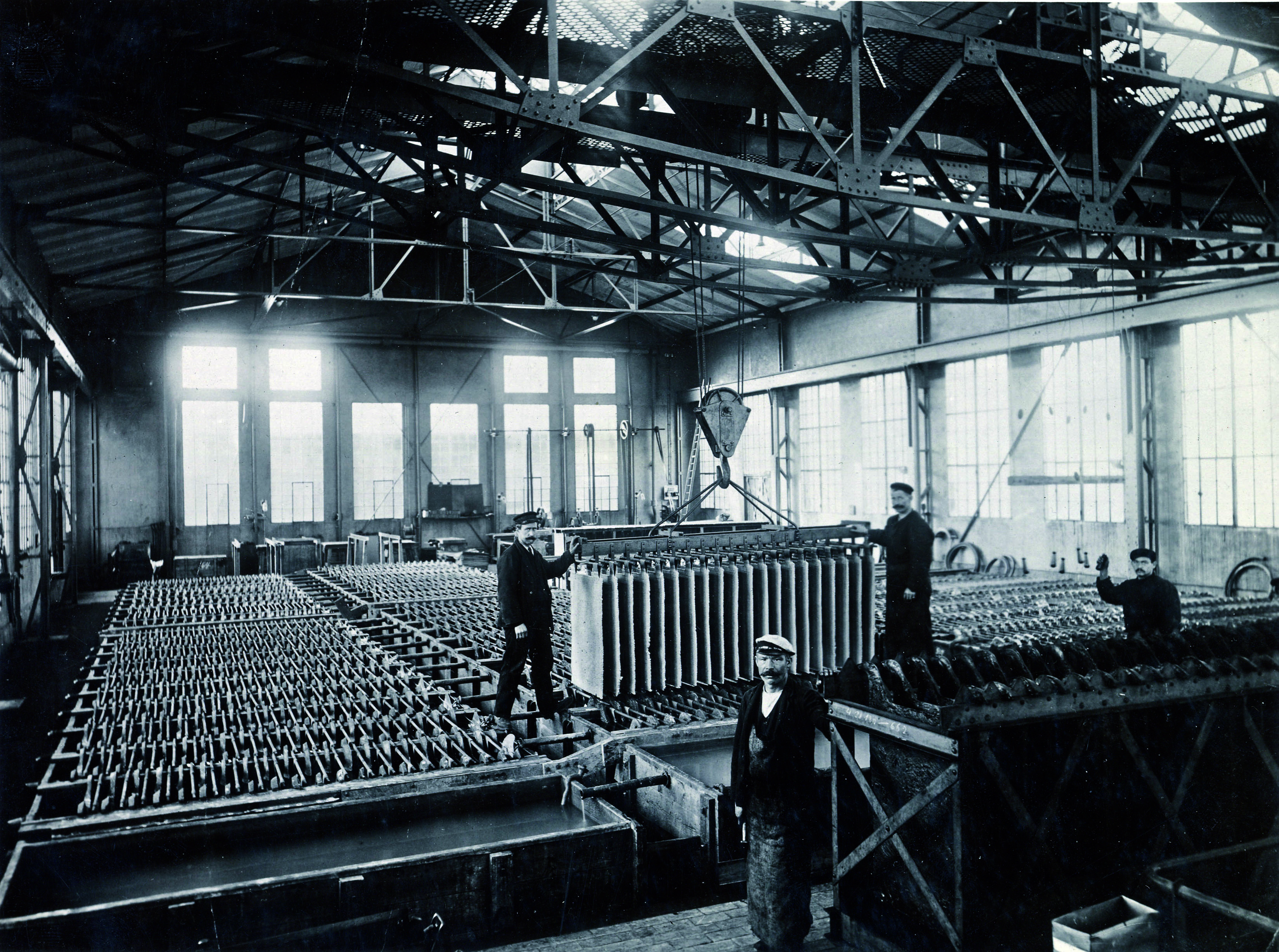
Electrolysis at Peute around 1910

In the course of the foundation of the German Reich in 1871 and the introduction of the Reich-wide single currency Mark in 1873, the company returned to the affination of coins, as previously issued coins had to be recycled to a certain extent. In 1908, the expansion and relocation of the Norddeutsche Affinerie to the Peute, an industrial area in today's Hamburg-Veddel, began. The final move and complete demolition of the old plants and facilities took place in 1913. During this upheaval, the new major shareholders Frankfurter Metallbank and Metallurgische Gesellschaft and Deutsche Gold- und Silber-Scheideanstalt (later Degussa) joined in, whereupon Norddeutsche Bank's shareholding was reduced to 50%.

=== Time of the World Wars ===
With the outbreak of World War I in 1914, the blockade of the North Sea by the British Royal Navy increasingly dried up the supply of raw materials and primary products, while at the same time the demand for war equipment increased. Initially, voluntary metal donations were processed into war material. Later, expropriated household items as well as church bells and organ pipes were also melted down through the influence of a state-owned company. During the war, Belgian and Russian prisoners of war were also employed as forced labourers.

After the end of World War I in 1918, the Norddeutsche Affinerie was affected by the transition to a peacetime economy, labor shortages, high inflation and outdated equipment. In 1921, major investments were made in the site. In 1926, the British Metal Corporation acquired a 26% stake in Norddeutsche Affinerie, while two years later 51% of Chemiefabrik J. E. Devrient AG was acquired and incorporated into the Group. Despite the Great Depression starting in 1929, the company proved resilient and was able to expand its product range.

After the National Socialists came to power (1933), the company experienced a massive upswing. At the same time, three people of Jewish descent, Richard Merton, Julius Levisohn and Heinrich Wohlwill, had to resign from the board of directors. With Wilhelm Avieny from Metallgesellschaft and Hermann Schlosser from Degussa, two people who were closely linked to National Socialist politics took over leading positions on the Supervisory board in 1939. On the eve of World War II, the company covered half of Germany's copper consumption and employed around 1,450 people.

From 1940, the Norddeutsche Affinerie was involved in the processing of looted gold that had been extorted from Jewish owners. The company also played a leading role in a so-called metal donation from the German people and, in addition to voluntary donations, also melted down expropriated grave crosses, fountains, monuments and church bells.The bombing raids of Operation Gomorrah (July and August 1943) hit the factory rather indirectly: although the factory suffered a few bomb hits, the damage was limited compared to other areas of the city. Nevertheless, operations were at times at a standstill because large parts of the population and workforce had left Hamburg and only gradually returned. The damage caused by an air raid on November 4, 1944 was much more serious, and operations at the Norddeutsche Affinerie did not restart until the end of the war.

During the Second World War, Norddeutsche Affinerie was an important supplier for the arms industry and used forced laborers in production. At its peak in July 1944, 806 forced laborers were employed out of a total workforce of around 1900, although an offer of a further 1,000 to 1,500 forced laborers from the Neuengamme concentration camp was rejected.

=== Developments up to the IPO (1998) ===
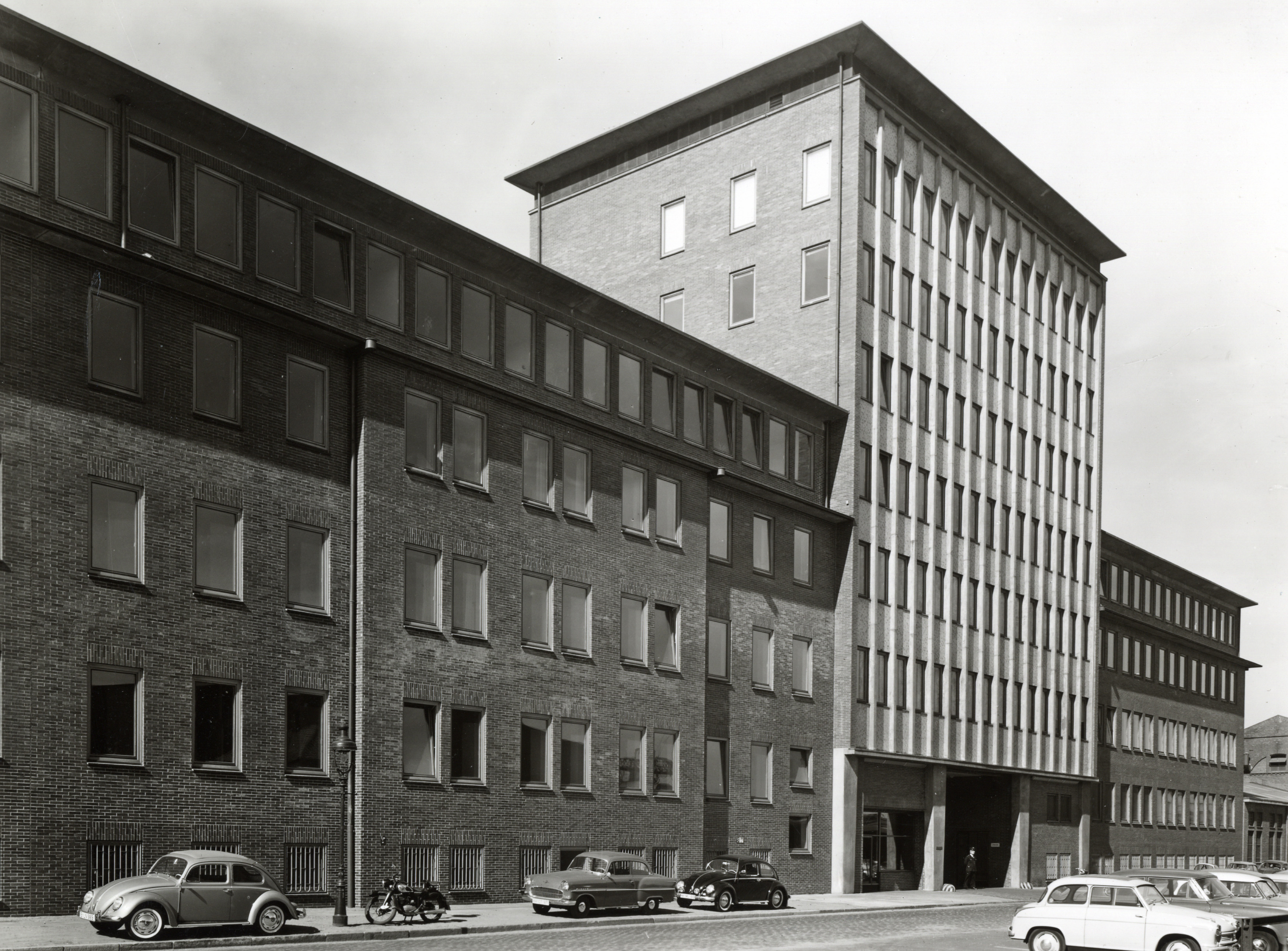
Administration building of Norddeutsche Affinerie (1959)

After the end of the war and the beginning of the British occupation, the plant was threatened with dismantling. The first was carried out at the beginning of 1946 and concerned the facilities for aluminium powder production. By mid-1946, however, dismantling plans were obsolete. Confiscation of the metal that had been stored on the factory premises since the war was prevented. After an initial labor shortage, production slowly ramped up again from mid-1946.

The “Wirtschaftswunder” followed with the Marshall Plan in 1947 and the subsequent Currency Reform of 1948, which helped Norddeutsche Affinerie to regain its former size. International supplier relationships were also re-established. From the beginning of the 1960s, Norddeutsche Affinerie hired foreign workers due to the labour shortage in the West Germany. In 1973, the company employed around 3,000 people; 38.5 percent were foreign workers.

From 1969, international projects and investments were made, such as in the Otavi Mining Company, Transvaal Alloys and Freeport Indonesia. In 1975, the company founded the joint venture Deutsche Giessdraht GmbH together with the Chilean copper producer Codelco and the German Hüttenwerke Kayser from Lünen.

In July 1998, Norddeutsche Affinerie went public, with 70% of the shares being transferred to the free float, while the main shareholders Inmet Mining, Mount Isa Holding and Degussa each held 10% of the remaining shares.

=== Since the IPO ===
In September 1999, the joint venture partner Kayser was fully acquired by Norddeutsche Affinerie. The company anticipated that the debut of the euro coins would cause 100,000 tonnes of copper-based former coinage to be recycled in Germany, and that some of the new coins would use copper as a major part of the Nordic gold alloy. In 2002, Prymetall, which previously operated a copper pre-rolling plant together with Wieland-Werke in Stolberg, was acquired. In February 2008, Norddeutsche Affinerie took over more than 91% of the Belgian copper processor Cumerio. In April 2008, the complete takeover of Cumerio for around EUR 777 million was completed by means of a squeeze-out. On April 1, 2009, the company was renamed Aurubis AG. At the same time, Prymetall GmbH & Co. KG was renamed Aurubis Stolberg GmbH & Co. KG. In 2011, Aurubis completed the acquisition of the former Luvata Rolled Products Division.

In June 2020, Aurubis completed the acquisition of the Belgian-Spanish Metallo Group. In 2022, part of the Flat Rolled Products Division was sold to KME SE for around EUR 63 million. The sale included the sites in Zutphen (Netherlands) and the cutting centers in Birmingham (UK), Dolný Kubín (Slovakia) and Mortara (Italy) with a total of around 360 employees. In the same year, the company announced an investment of around EUR 200 million in a pilot plant and later a plant for battery recycling at the Hamburg site.

In May 2023, a serious industrial accident occurred at Aurubis's primary copper smelter plant in Hamburg. Following a nitrogen leak during regular maintenance, three fatalities were reported. In June 2023, it became known that Aurubis had apparently been systematically and extensively robbed by employees and subcontractors for years. The loss amount was in the low three-digit million range. The previous Executive Board members, with the exception of Inge Hofkens, who was only appointed in 2023, had to leave their posts. In September 2024, the reorganization of the Executive Board was completed.

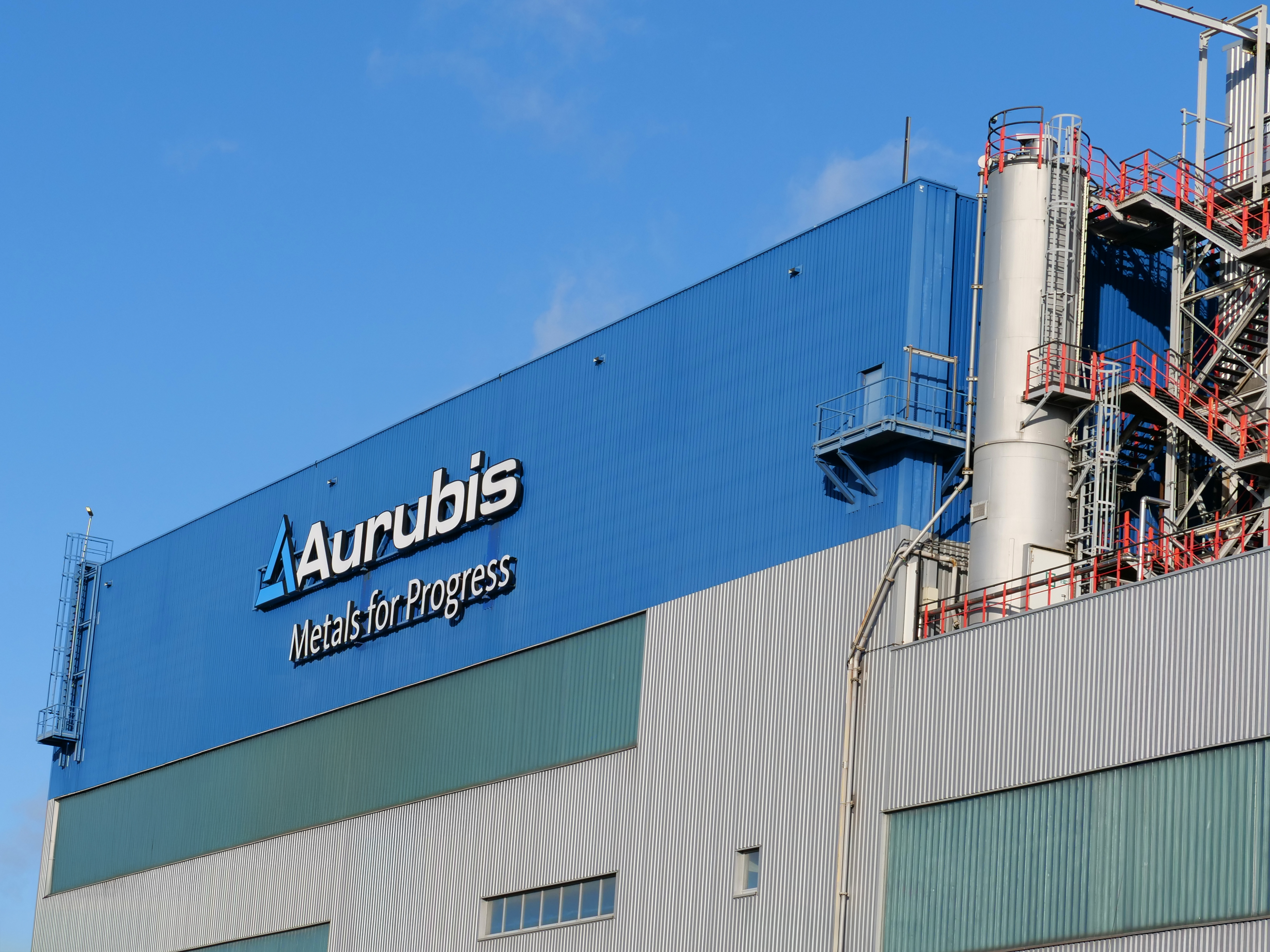
Building for anode sludge processing in Hamburg

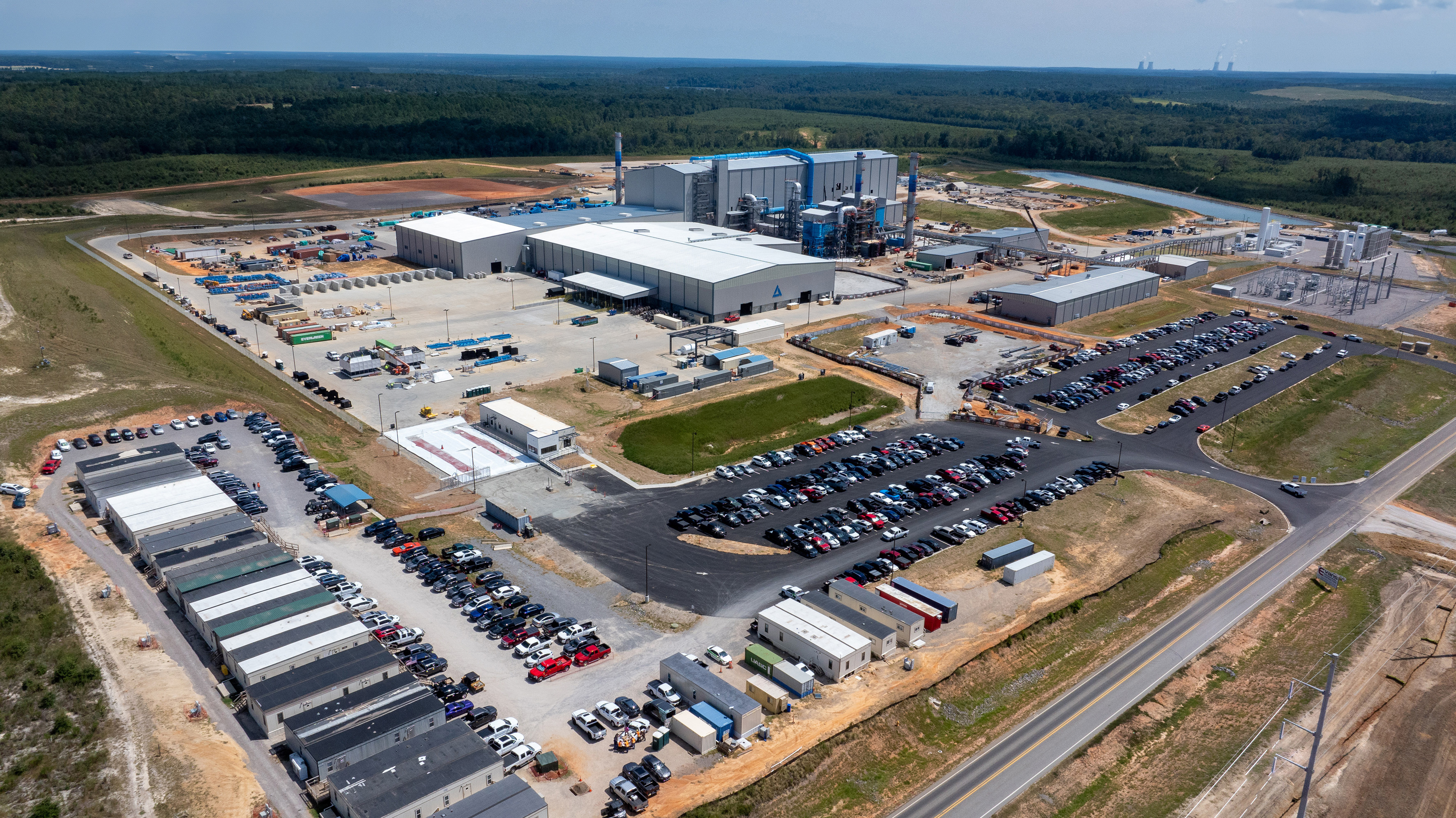
Richmond site, Georgia (USA)

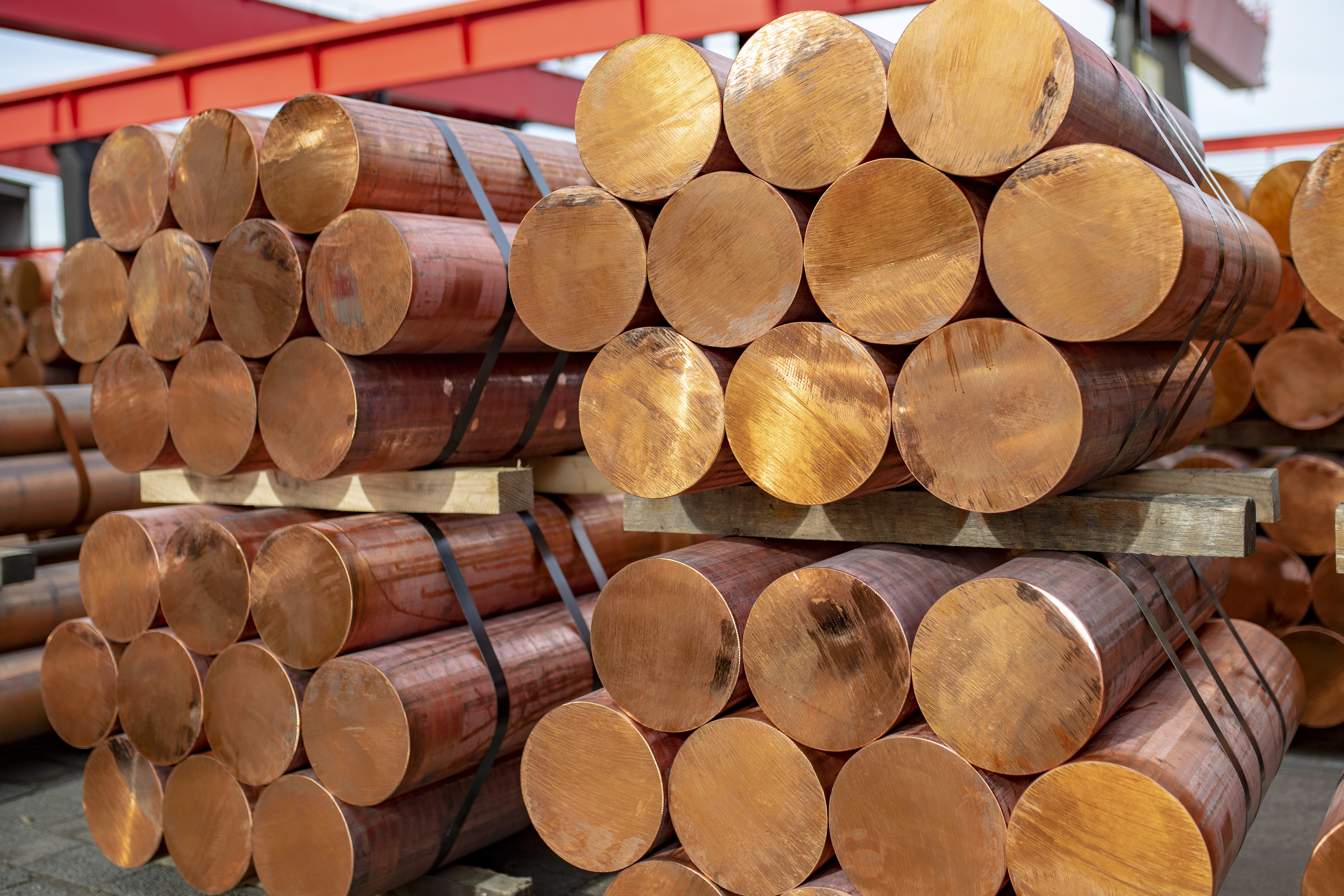
Continuous casting storage area in Hamburg

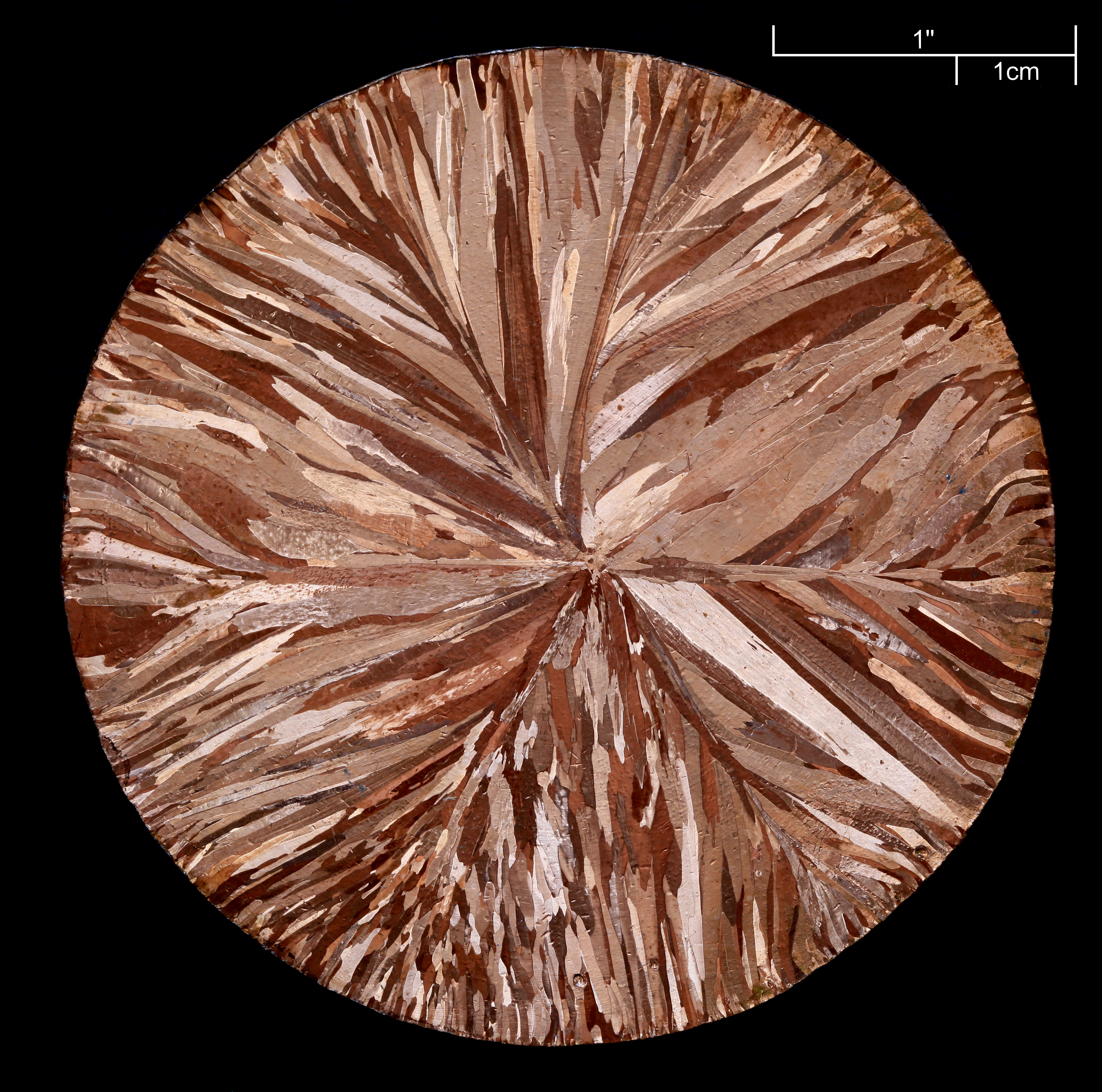
Cross section of an Aurubis copper billet

== Activities ==
Aurubis processes metal concentrates into primary products for the processing industry. Copper is the most important metal. Gold, silver, lead, tin and zinc as well as the by-metals tellurium, selenium and platinum group metals are also processed. Aurubis also recycles metals that are found in particular in industrial residues and electrical and electronic devices. Copper plays the largest role here as a scrap metal. The company sells metal products (especially copper products), sulphuric acid and by-products from the production processes. Continuous cast wire rod and continuous cast products in various formats are the most important products.

== Shares ==
Aurubis shares belong to the Prime Standard segment of the German Stock Exchange (Deutsche Börse) and are included in the MDAX and STOXX Europe 600, among others.

Share allocation (Status: December 11, 2025):

- Salzgitter AG - 29,99 %
- Rossmann Beteiligungs GmbH (Dirk Rossmann family) - 11,61 %
- Aurubis AG - 2,89 %
- Free float - 55,51 %

== Public perception ==
=== Environmental impact ===
In the late 1970s, a local environmental group conducted measurements in eastern districts of Hamburg and found significantly elevated concentrations of heavy metals in the air. The environmental authorities then ordered soil tests. However, the results were not published. When this secrecy was discovered in 1985, it led to the so-called arsenic scandal in Hamburg. In the years that followed, the company implemented investment programs worth several hundred million German marks to modernize its facilities, which also significantly reduced its environmental impact. Between 2000 and 2021, the company invested a total of around €650 million in environmental protection measures at all its sites, including around €300 million at its Hamburg site.

Nussir, a Norwegian mining company, planned to build the world's first carbon-neutral copper mine north of the Arctic Circle, on the Repparfjorden. It planned to supply the copper ore extracted there to Aurubis. The Sami people living there protested against this together with environmental and human rights organizations and prevailed. Aurubis cited “certain social aspects” as the reason for its withdrawal in 2021.

=== Awards ===
- In 2021, Aurubis won the Responsible Care competition organized by the German Chemical Industry Association with a project to decarbonize the copper process.
- The company was honored with the German Sustainability Award in 2024. The jury emphasized that the company had made “particularly effective, exemplary contributions” to the transformation of the industry into a climate-neutral economy.
