= Compagnie Nationale à Portefeuille =

Belgian holding company

Compagnie Nationale à Portefeuille SA

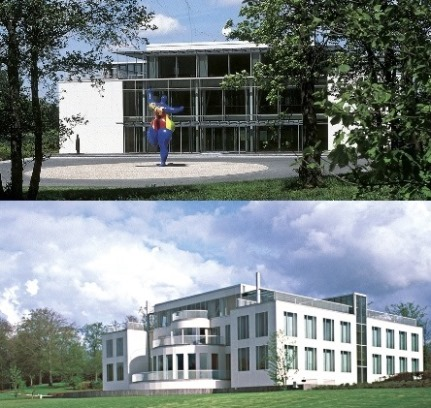
- Company type: Non-listed holding company
- Headquarters: Loverval, Belgium
- Key people: Xavier Le Clef (Managing Director)
- Total assets: Approximately €1.5 billion (2014 net assets value)
- Parent: Frère-Bourgeois
- Website: www.cnp.be

Compagnie Nationale à Portefeuille SA (CNP) is a Belgian non-listed holding company. Together with Groupe Bruxelles Lambert, CNP is one of the main pillars of Groupe Frère-Bourgeois (founded by Albert, Baron frère) and can rely on a stable shareholders’ base: it is exclusively controlled by the Frère family.

== Investments ==
CNP directly holds stakes in a number of industrial companies, which at the end of 2014 included:

- Total (0.9%), the fifth-largest publicly traded integrated international oil and gas company in the world, active both on the upstream (exploration/production) and downstream (refining, distribution) segments
- M6 (7.3%), a multimedia group that revolves around M6, France's second commercial TV channel, and also includes a family of highly complementary digital channels and diversification activities developed around a powerful brand
- Transcor Astra Group (88%) that operates in the petroleum products, gas, coal and coke trading and distribution sectors, through owned or rented assets (pipelines, storage facilities, oil tankers, refineries)
- Affichage Holding (25.3%), advertising company
- Cheval Blanc Finance, that holds 50% of the Société Civile du Cheval Blanc, which owns the Saint Emilion Premier Grand Cru Classé A estate (37 hectares), la Tour du Pin(8 hectares) and Quinault l’Enclos (18 hectares) vineyards
- Caffitaly (49%)
- International Duty Free (100%), the operator of retail shops at the main Belgian airports (Brussels, Charleroi) and at Brussels international railway station

== Ownership and control ==
In March 2011 CNP was delisted, after a successful takeover bid from Groupe Frère-Bourgeois (70% economic ownership) and BNP Paribas (30%) for the 27.8% of CNP they did not already own. The CNP share was removed from the BEL 20 index on 2 May 2011.

Groupe Frère-Bourgeois acquired BNP Paribas’s stake in CNP at the end of 2013. As a result, CNP is now exclusively controlled by Groupe Frère-Bourgeois, alongside management and personnel.
