= Groenten uit Balen (play) =

1972 play written by Walter van den Broeck

- Written by: Walter van den Broeck
- Original language: Dutch

Premiere
- Date premiered: 1972

Groenten uit Balen ("Vegetables from Balen") is a Flemish theatre play written by Walter van den Broeck in 1972. Later, he converted the play into a novel. In 2011, Van den Broek and Guido Van Meir once again adapted the novel into a movie.

== Plot ==
Groenten uit Balen is based upon real events which took place in the Belgian community Balen. In 1971, it turned out the workmen of Vieille Montagne in the other Belgian plants had a much higher salary for similar work. The workers in Balen wanted a raise. This led to a dispute between the workmen, the trade unions and the directors board. The 1500 workmen in Balen went on a strike but this was not accepted by the trade unions. As a result, the workmen did not earn any money at all. The strike went on for 9 weeks. Many charities were set up by inhabitants of Mol and Balen. Jef Sleeckx, a politician, convinced the banks to cancel payments temporarily for affected workmen. Houselords did not ask rent during the strike. Shops gave food for free or gave the impacted workmen a temporary job. At the end, the directors board agreed and the workmen even got a higher wage than requested.

The novel is about the fictive family Debruyker. Father Jan is unskilled and works at Vieille Montagne. He frequently writes letters to king Baudouin of Belgium. His wife Clara does the householding and always intercepts the letters and burns them. Their daughter Germaine is 18-year-old and just finished high school. Grandfather is retired and the family use to live in a working-class neighborhood not that far from Vieille Montagne.

Germaine hopes for a better life. Her father does not earn that much and they live in a small, rather poor environment. The houses have no luxury and the toilets are still outside, which obliges the families to use outdated chamber pots during night or freeze periods. Furthermore, Germaine is convinced all earth in a rather large area is poisoned with lead and zinc. There is already proof as there are almost no trees and plants.

Life becomes complicated when a strike starts at Vieille Montagne. Grandfather is from another generation where workmen had almost no rights. According to him Jan should be happy, he has a job and he should follow the decisions of the directors board even if he has a lower wage in comparison with the other factories. He forces his son to go to work and forbids him to go on strike. Jan wants to follow the advice of his father, but once at the factory it seems those who want to work are being thrown in the canal or beaten up by other workmen. This results in a strike of all 1500 employees. Jan writes a letter to the king and requests him to do something about the situation often the letter is again burnt by Clara.

In meantime, Germaine works at the GB supermarket in a Mall as a cashier but gets fired after she stole glue. This means the family has no income at all, thanks to the actions of politician Jef Sleeckx. Germaine meets Luc, a student at the university during a party they fall in love. Not much later, Germaine gets ill and use to vomit frequently. After a visit to the doctor it was found that she was pregnant. As this is a scandal and abortion is a taboo, Germaine should marry Luc. However, Luc does not want to raise the child and focusses on his studies. That's why Clara decides to visit his parents who live in a mansion. Although, Clara is a rather assertive person she was bribed with expensive chocolates and drinks. Luc gets aware of Germain's situation and changes his mind. He does want to raise the child whilst combining his studies with some job. There is also good news from Vieille Montagne: the directors board decided to raise wages.

Jan once again writes a letter to the king to thank him. Jan is convinced his previous letter was partially the key to the solution.

== Title ==
The title is based upon a writing error in Jan's last letter to the king. He ends this letter with a salutation. He wants to write "Groeten uit Balen", which means "Greetings from Balen", but writes "Groenten uit Balen", which means "Vegetables from Balen".

== Film adaptation ==
The play was adapted to film in 2011, directed by Frank Van Mechelen.
