= Heibel =

Heibel is a surname. Notable people with the surname include:

- Hermann Heibel (1912–1941), German swimmer
- Robert J. Heibel, American intelligence agent and academic
