= Olen, Belgium =

Olen
- Municipality
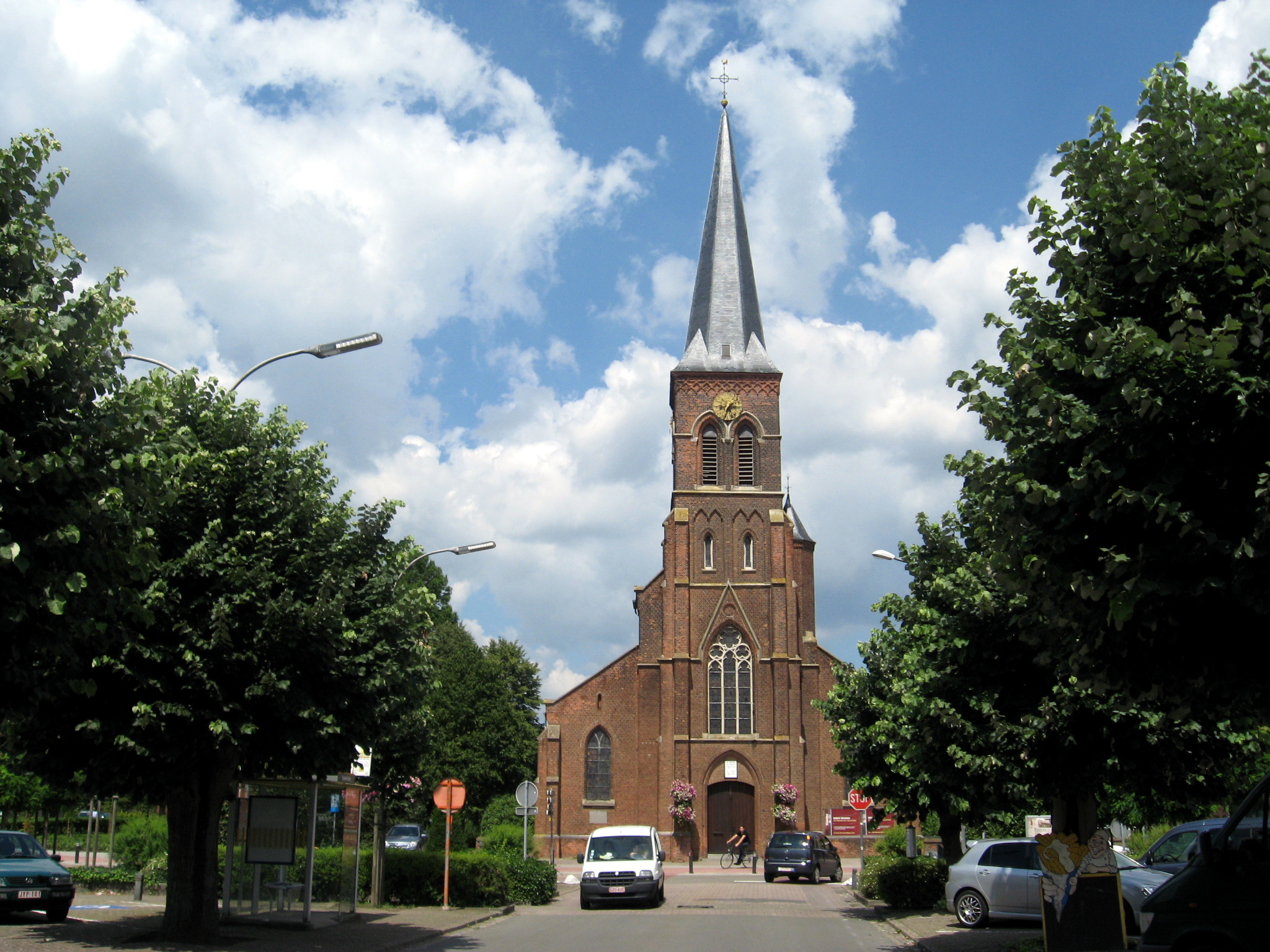

- Flag Coat of arms

- Location of Olen in the province of Antwerp
- Interactive map of Olen
- Location in Belgium
- Coordinates: 51°09′N 04°51′E
- Country: Belgium
- Community: Flemish Community
- Region: Flemish Region
- Province: Antwerp
- Arrondissement: Turnhout

Government
  - Mayor: Seppe Bouquillon (CD&V)
  - Governing parties: CD&V, sp.a, Groen

Area
  - Total: 23.12 km^{2} (8.93 sq mi)

Population (2020-01-01)
  - Total: 12,560
  - Density: 543.3/km^{2} (1,407/sq mi)
- Postal codes: 2250
- NIS code: 13029
- Area codes: 014, 04
- Website: www.olen.be

Olen (Dutch pronunciation: [ˈoːlə(n)]) is a municipality located in the Belgian province of Antwerp. The municipality comprises three towns, situated on a south–north axis:

- South of the motorway E313 and the Albert Canal is Olen proper, also called Olen-Centrum (Saint-Martins parish).
- Between the Albert Canal and Olen-station (railroad from Antwerp to Neerpelt and Hasselt) is the town of Boekel, also called Onze-Lieve-Vrouw-Olen (parish) or Achter-Olen (Behind-Olen).
- North of the railroad is the town of St.-Jozef-Olen (parish), also called Olen-Fabriek (Olen-Factory, a refinery along the old canal Herentals-Bocholt that was at its origin).

In 2021, Olen had a total population of 12,600. The total area is 23.10 km^{2}.

== History of Uranium mining ==
In the 1920s and 1930s the Union Minière du Haut Katanga company, operating in the then Belgian colony of Congo, had a virtual monopoly of the world uranium market (holding most of the deposits known at the time). The uranium mined in Congo was mostly transported to the UMHK refinery for uranium ore which was located in Olen.

Some 1200 tonnes of uranium stored at the Olen refinery were captured by the Germans during the invasion and occupation of Belgium in 1940, and only recovered by US troops in April 1945 at Staßfurt (Anhalt).

== Notable Person ==
- Walter van den Broeck (b. Olen 28 March 1941), writer
