= List of companies of Germany =

Location of Germany

Germany is a federal parliamentary republic in central-western Europe. Germany has the world's 3rd largest economy by nominal GDP, and the 5th largest by PPP. As a global leader in several industrial and technological sectors, it is both the world's third-largest exporter and importer of goods.

Of the world's 500 largest stock-market-listed companies measured by revenue in 2017, the Fortune Global 500, 29 are headquartered in Germany. 40 Germany-based companies are included in the DAX, the German stock market index. Well-known international brands include Mercedes-Benz, BMW, Deutsche Telekom, Volkswagen, Audi, Siemens, Bosch, Porsche, Adidas and SAP.

Germany is recognised for its large portion of specialised small and medium enterprises, known as the Mittelstand. Around 1,000 of these companies are global market leaders in their segment and are labelled hidden champions.

For further information on the types of business entities in this country and their abbreviations, see "Business entities in Germany".

== Largest firms ==
This list shows firms in the Fortune Global 500, which ranks firms by total revenues reported before 31 January 2025. Only the top five firms (if available) are included as a sample.

Rank	Image	Name	2024 revenues (US$M)	Employees	Notes
11		Volkswagen Group	348,408	684,025	Multinational consumer and commercial vehicle manufacturer operating in more than 150 countries. Consumer brands include Audi, SEAT, Škoda Auto, Porsche, Bentley, MAN and Scania .
41		BMW	168,103	154,950	Vehicle manufacturer producing commercial and consumer automobiles and motorcycles. Brands include Mini, Rolls-Royce Motor Cars, and BMW Motorrad (motorcycles).
42		Mercedes-Benz Group	165,638	166,056	Stuttgart-based multinational automotive manufacturer. Brands include Mercedes-Benz, Mercedes-AMG, Maybach, Setra, and Smart.
77		Deutsche Telekom	121,046	199,652	Bonn-based multinational telecommunication company focused on fixed-line and mobile communications, digital media and internet service provider. The largest communication company of Germany and Europe.
79		Uniper	116,662	6,863	Düsseldorf-based state-owned multinational energy company.

== Notable firms ==
This list includes notable companies with primary headquarters located in the country. The industry and sector follow the Industry Classification Benchmark taxonomy. Organizations that have ceased operations are included and noted as defunct.

Notable companies Status: P=Private, S=State; A=Active, D=Defunct
Name	Industry	Sector	Headquarters	Founded	Notes	Status	
Aareal Bank	Financials	Banks	Wiesbaden	1922	Banking and financial services	P	A
Abeking & Rasmussen	Industrials	Shipbuilding	Lemwerder	1907	Shipbuilidng, defence vessels	P	A
ABO Energy	Energy	Alternative energy	Wiesbaden	1996	Renewable energy	P	A
About You	Technology	Internet	Hamburg	2014	Online fashion retailer	P	A
ABUS	Industrials	Electronic equipment	Wetter	1924	Security devices manufacturer	P	A
Adidas	Consumer goods	Clothing & accessories	Herzogenaurach	1924	Shoes & sports apparel & accessories manufacturer	P	A
AEG	Industrials	Electrical components & equipment	Frankfurt	1883	Electrical equipment manufacturer, defunct 1996	P	D
Aixtron	Industrials	Industrial machinery	Herzogenrath	1983	Manufacturing equipment	P	A
Alb-Gold	Consumer goods	Food products	Trochtelfingen	1968	Food	P	A
Aldi	Consumer services	Food retailers & wholesalers	Essen	1913	Discount retail chains	P	A
Allgaier	Consumer goods	Auto parts	Uhingen	1906	Automotive supplier	P	A
Allgeier	Technology	Software and computer services	Munich	1977	Information technology services	P	A
Allianz	Financials	Full line insurance	Munich	1890	Insurance and asset management	P	A
Alnatura	Consumer services	Food retailers & wholesalers	Darmstadt	1984	Organic food supermarket	P	A
Altana	Basic materials	Speciality chemicals	Wesel	1977	Chemicals	P	A
Aral	Oil & gas	Refining & marketing	Bochum	1898	Petroleum products	P	A
Arburg	Industrials	Industrial machinery	Loßburg	1923	Machinery and injection molding	P	A
Arcor	Telecommunications	Fixed line telecommunications	Eschborn	1996	Defunct, now part of Vodafone Germany	P	D
Audi	Consumer goods	Automobiles	Ingolstadt	1910	Auto manufacturer, part of Volkswagen Group	P	A
Aumovio	Consumer goods	Auto parts	Frankfurt	2025	Automotive supplier	P	A
Aurubis	Basic materials	Copper	Hamburg	2008	Copper manufacturing	P	A
Auto Union	Consumer goods	Automobiles	Ingolstadt	1932	Defunct, now part of Audi	P	D
Avira	Technology	Software	Tettnang	1986	Software	P	A
Axel Springer	Consumer services	Publishing	Berlin	1946	Digital publishing	P	A
B. Braun	Health care	Pharmaceuticals, Medical equipment	Melsungen	1839	Medical devices and pharma	P	A
Bahlsen	Consumer goods	Food products	Hanover	1889	Biscuits	P	A
BASF	Basic materials	Speciality chemicals	Ludwigshafen	1865	Chemicals	P	A
Bayer	Health care	Pharmaceuticals	Leverkusen	1863	Chemicals and pharmaceuticals	P	A
BayWa	Consumer goods	Farming & fishing	Munich	1923	Agribusiness conglomerate	P	A
BBS Kraftfahrzeugtechnik	Consumer goods	Auto parts	Schiltach	1970	Automotive parts	P	A
Bechtle	Technology	Software	Neckarsulm	1983	Information technology services	P	A
Beckhoff Automation	Industrials	Electronic equipment	Verl	1980	Automation technology	P	A
Behnisch Architekten	Industrials	Business support services	Stuttgart	1989	Architecture	P	A
Beiersdorf	Consumer goods	Personal products	Hamburg	1882	Cosmetics	P	A
Benecke-Kaliko	Consumer goods	Auto parts	Hanover	1718	Automotive parts	P	A
Berlin Chemie	Health care	Pharmaceuticals	Berlin	1890	Pharmaceuticals	P	A
Berliner Verkehrsbetriebe	Industrials	Transportation services	Berlin	1928	Public transport, manages the Berlin U-Bahn	S	A
Bernard Krone Holding	Industrials	Machinery: agricultural	Spelle	1906	Agricultural machinery and equipment	P	A
Bertelsmann	Consumer services	Broadcasting & entertainment	Gütersloh	1835	Mass media	P	A
Beyerdynamic	Consumer goods	Consumer electronics	Heilbronn	1924	Audio electronics	P	A
Bihler	Industrials	Industrial machinery	Halblech	1958	Manufacturing equipment	P	A
Bilfinger	Industrials	Heavy construction	Mannheim	1880	Construction, engineering and services	P	A
Birkenstock	Consumer goods	Clothing & accessories	Neustadt	1774	Shoe manufacturer	P	A
BioNTech	Health care	Biotechnology	Mainz	2008	Vaccine	P	A
Blaser	Industrials	Defense	Isny im Allgäu	1957	Firearms	P	A
Blaupunkt	Consumer goods	Consumer electronics	Hildesheim	1924	Consumer electronics	P	A
Blohm+Voss	Industrials	Shipbuilding	Hamburg	1877	Shipyard	P	A
BMW	Consumer goods	Automobiles	Munich	1916	Automotive	P	A
Boehringer Ingelheim	Health care	Pharmaceuticals	Ingelheim am Rhein	1885	Pharmaceuticals	P	A
Bölkow	Industrials	Aerospace	Stuttgart	1948	Aircraft manufacturer, defunct 1968, merged into Messerschmitt-Bölkow-Blohm	P	D
Bonprix	Technology	Internet	Hamburg	1986	Online and mail order fashion retail (e-commerce) owned by Otto Group	P	A
Bosch	Conglomerates	-	Gerlingen	1886	Automotive parts, computing, engineering, home appliances	P	A
Bosch Rexroth	Industrials	Industrial machinery	Lohr am Main	2001	Industrial automation, drive and control technology, industrial and mobile hydraulic systems; part of Bosch	P	A
Braun	Consumer goods	Personal products	Kronberg	1921	Razors and small appliances	P	A
Brenntag	Industrials	Transportation services	Mülheim	1874	Chemical distribution	P	A
Brita	Consumer goods	Household equipment and products	Taunusstein	1966	Water filters	P	A
Brose Fahrzeugteile	Consumer goods	Auto parts	Coburg	1908	Automotive parts	P	A
Bürkert	Industrials	Industrial machinery	Ingelfingen	1946	Components and systems for measurement and control	P	A
C&A	Consumer goods	Apparel retail	Düsseldorf	1841	Apparel and accessory retail	P	A
Cancom	Technology	Software and computer services	Munich	1992	Information technology services	P	A
Carl Walther GmbH	Industrials	Defense	Ulm	1886	Firearms	P	A
Carl Zeiss AG	Industrials	Electronic equipment	Oberkochen	1846	Optical systems, imaging equipment	P	A
Carl Zeiss Meditec	Health care	Medical equipment	Jena	2002	Medical technology	P	A
Carl Zeiss SMT	Industrials	Electronic equipment	Oberkochen	2001	Semiconductor manufacturing technology	P	A
Ceconomy	Consumer services	Broadline retailers	Düsseldorf	2017	Retail holding company	P	A
Celesio	Health care	Pharmaceuticals	Stuttgart	1835	Pharmaceuticals, defunct 2017, now part of McKesson	P	D
Claas	Industrials	Machinery: agricultural	Harsewinkel	1913	Agricultural machinery	P	A
Commerzbank	Financials	Banks	Frankfurt	1870	Banking	P	A
Condor Flugdienst	Consumer services	Airlines	Frankfurt	1955	Leisure airline	P	A
Conrad Electronic	Technology	Internet	Hirschau	1923	Online electronics retailer (e-commerce)	P	A
Continental	Consumer goods	Auto parts	Hanover	1871	Auto parts, tires and supplies	P	A
Covestro	Basic materials	Speciality chemicals	Leverkusen	2015	Materials and coatings, part of Bayer	P	A
CureVac	Health care	Biotechnology	Tübingen	2000	Vaccine	P	A
Daimler Truck	Industrials	Commercial vehicles & trucks	Stuttgart	2019	Automotive, part of Mercedes-Benz Group	P	A
DASA	Industrials	Aerospace & defense	Munich	1989	Aircraft manufacturer, defunct 2000, merged into Airbus	P	D
Deichmann	Consumer goods	Apparel retail	Essen	1913	Footwear retail	P	A
DELO	Basic materials	Speciality chemicals	Windach	1961	Industrial adhesives	P	A
Deutsche Bahn	Industrials	Railroads	Berlin	1994	State railways	S	A
Deutsche Bank	Financials	Banks	Frankfurt	1870	Banking	P	A
Deutsche Börse	Financials	Investment services	Frankfurt	1992	Securities marketplace	P	A
Deutsche Pfandbriefbank	Financials	Banks	Unterschleißheim	2015	Real estate financing bank	P	A
Deutsche Post	Industrials	Delivery services	Bonn	1995	Postal services	P	A
Deutsche Telekom	Telecommunications	Fixed line telecommunications	Bonn	1995	Telecommunications	P	A
Deutsche Vermögensberatung	Financials	Investment services	Frankfurt	1975	Financial advice	P	A
Deutsche Welle	Consumer services	Broadcasting & entertainment	Bonn	1953	State-owned media company	S	A
Deutz	Industrials	Industrial machinery	Cologne	1864	Internal combustion engines, electric drive systems	P	A
DHL	Industrials	Delivery services	Bonn	1969	Logistics, part of Deutsche Post	P	A
Dieffenbacher	Industrials	Industrial machinery	Eppingen	1873	Machinery	P	A
Diehl	Conglomerates	-	Nuremberg	1902	Aviation equipment, defence technology, electronic control systems, measuring instrument technology	P	A
Diehl Aerospace	Industrials	Aerospace & defense	Überlingen	2006	Avionics	P	A
Diehl Defence	Industrials	Aerospace & defense	Überlingen	2004	Ammunitions, electronics, missile systems	P	A
Diehl Metall	Basic materials	Nonferrous metals	Röthenbach an der Pegnitz	1938	Metals, forges	P	A
Dillinger Hütte	Basic materials	Iron & steel	Dillingen	1809	Steel	P	A
dm-drogerie markt	Consumer services	Drug retailers	Karlsruhe	1973	Pharmacy retail chains	P	A
DMG Mori Aktiengesellschaft	Industrials	Industrial machinery	Bielefeld	1870	Machine tools	P	A
DMK Deutsches Milchkontor	Consumer goods	Food products	Zeven	2010	Dairy	P	A
Döhler	Consumer goods	Food products	Darmstadt	1838	Flavours, food additives	P	A
Dornier Flugzeugwerke	Industrials	Aerospace	Friedrichshafen	1922	Aircraft manufacturer, defunct 2002, merged into DASA	P	D
Dr. Oetker	Consumer goods	Food & beverages	Bielefeld	1891	Food producer	P	A
Dräger	Health care	Medical equipment	Lübeck	1889	Medical technology, safety technology	P	A
Dräxlmaier	Consumer goods	Auto parts	Vilsbiburg	1958	Automotive supplier	P	A
Duravit	Consumer goods	Furniture	Hornberg	1817	Bathroom furniture, wellness systems, sanitary ceramics	P	A
Dürr Group	Industrials	Industrial machinery	Stuttgart	1895	Plant and machinery construction	P	A
Dynamit Nobel	Basic materials	Speciality chemicals	Troisdorf	1865	Chemicals, explosives	P	A
DZ Bank	Financials	Banks	Frankfurt	2001	Banking and financial services	P	A
E.ON	Utilities	Electricity	Essen	2000	Electric power	P	A
Eberspächer	Consumer goods	Auto parts	Esslingen am Neckar	1865	Automotive supplier	P	A
ebm-papst	Industrials	Industrial machinery	Mulfingen	1963	Electric motors and fans	P	A
EDAG	Industrials	Business support services	Wiesbaden	1969	Engineering services	P	A
Edeka	Consumer services	Food retailers & wholesalers	Hamburg	1907	Supermarkets	P	A
Eibach	Consumer goods	Auto parts	Finnentrop	1951	Automotive parts	P	A
Einhell	Industrials	Industrial machinery	Landau an der Isar	1964	Power tools, gardening tools	P	A
Elmos Semiconductor	Technology	Semiconductors	Dortmund	1984	Semiconductor products	P	A
ElringKlinger	Consumer goods	Auto parts	Dettingen an der Erms	1879	Automotive parts	P	A
EnBW	Utilities	Electricity	Karlsruhe	1997	Electric power	P	A
Enercon	Industrials	Industrial machinery	Aurich	1984	Wind turbines	P	A
Ensinger	Industrials	Plastics	Nufringen	1966	Plastics processing	P	A
Entwicklungsring Nord	Industrials	Aerospace	Bremen	1961	Rocket parts, defunct 1977	P	D
Epcos	Consumer goods	Consumer electronics	Munich	1999	Electronics	P	A
E-Plus	Telecommunications	Mobile telecommunications	Düsseldorf	1992	Mobile network, part of Telefónica Germany	P	A
Eurowings	Consumer services	Airlines	Düsseldorf	1990	Part of Lufthansa	P	A
Evonik Industries	Basic materials	Speciality chemicals	Essen	2007	Speciality chemicals	P	A
Exyte	Industrials	Business support services	Stuttgart	1912	Building design, engineering, procurement and construction	P	A
Faber-Castell	Consumer goods	Nondurable household products	Stein	1761	Writing instruments	P	A
Fein	Consumer goods	Durable household products	Schwäbisch Gmünd	1867	Power tools	P	A
Fendt	Industrials	Machinery: agricultural	Marktoberdorf	1930	Agricultural machinery	P	A
Ferrostaal	Industrials	Industrial machinery	Essen	1920	Industrial services, machinery	P	A
Festo	Industrials	Industrial machinery	Esslingen am Neckar	1925	Automation	P	A
Focke-Achgelis	Industrials	Aerospace	Hoykenkamp	1937	Defunct helicopter manufacturer	P	D
Focke-Wulf	Industrials	Aerospace	Bremen	1923	Aircraft manufacturer, defunct 1964	P	D
Franz Haniel & Cie.	Conglomerates	-	Duisburg	1756	Holding company	P	A
Freenet	Telecommunications	Fixed line telecommunications	Büdelsdorf	2007	Telecommunications	P	A
Fresenius	Health care	Health care providers	Bad Homburg vor der Höhe	1912	Health care	P	A
Fresenius Medical Care	Health care	Health care providers	Bad Homburg vor der Höhe	1996	Part of Fresenius	P	A
Freudenberg Group	Conglomerates	-	Weinheim	1849	Household goods, textiles, seals, chemicals, filters, medical products	P	A
FRoSTA	Consumer goods	Food products	Bremerhaven	1905	Frozen foods	P	A
Fuchs Petrolub	Basic materials	Speciality chemicals	Mannheim	1931	Lubricants	P	A
Fulda	Consumer goods	Tires	Fulda	1900	Tires	P	A
G Data CyberDefense	Technology	Software	Bochum	1985	Software	P	A
GEA Group	Industrials	Industrial machinery	Düsseldorf	1881	Machinery and technology for refrigeration and livestock farming	P	A
Gerresheimer	Industrials	Containers & packaging	Düsseldorf	1864	Packaging products	P	A
Getrag	Consumer goods	Auto parts	Untergruppenbach	1935	Automotive parts	P	A
GfK	Industrials	Business support services	Nuremberg	1934	Market research	P	A
gmp	Industrials	Business support services	Hamburg	1965	Architecture	P	A
Goldbeck	Industrials	Construction	Bielefeld	1969	Construction	P	A
Gothaer Group	Financials	Full life insurance	Cologne	1820	Insurance and asset management	P	A
Grob-Werke	Industrials	Industrial machinery	Mindelheim	1926	Universal machines	P	A
Grohe	Industrials	Construction and materials	Düsseldorf	1936	Plumbing fixtures	P	A
Grundig	Consumer goods	Consumer electronics	Nuremberg	1930	Consumer electronics	P	A
Gruner + Jahr	Consumer services	Publishing	Hamburg	1965	Publishing house, part of Bertelsmann	P	A
Grünenthal	Health care	Pharmaceuticals	Stolberg	1946	Pharmaceuticals	P	A
Hahn Automation Group	Industrials	Industrial machinery	Rheinböllen	2017	Develop, design, build, and integrate automation solutions and production lines	P	A
Hama	Consumer goods	Consumer electronics	Monheim	1923	Various consumer products	P	A
Hamburg Süd	Industrials	Marine transportation	Hamburg	1871	Shipping	P	A
Hamburger Flugzeugbau	Industrials	Aerospace	Hamburg	1933	Aircraft manufacturer, defunct 1969, merged into Messerschmitt-Bölkow-Blohm	P	D
Hannover Re	Financials	Reinsurance	Hanover	1966	Reinsurance, part of Talanx	P	A
Hansgrohe	Industrials	Construction and materials	Schiltach	1901	Plumbing fixtures and materials	P	A
Hapag-Lloyd	Industrials	Marine transportation	Hamburg	1970	Shipping	P	A
Harro Höfliger Verpackungsmaschinen	Industrials	Industrial machinery	Allmersbach im Tal	1975	Production and packaging equipment	P	A
Heckler & Koch	Industrials	Defense	Oberndorf am Neckar	1948	Firearms	P	A
HeidelbergCement	Industrials	Construction and materials	Heidelberg	1874	Cement	P	A
Heidelberger Druckmaschinen	Industrials	Industrial machinery	Heidelberg	1850	Printing machines	P	A
Heidenhain	Industrials	Electronic equipment	Traunreut	1889	Measuring systems, numerical controls	P	A
Heinkel	Industrials	Aerospace	Warnemünde	1922	Aircraft manufacturer, defunct 1965	P	D
Heise Group	Consumer services	Publishing	Hanover	1949	Digital publishing	P	A
Hella	Consumer goods	Auto parts	Lippstadt	1899	Automotive parts	P	A
Heller Group	Industrials	Industrial machinery	Nürtingen	1894	Machine tools	P	A
Hellmann Worldwide Logistics	Industrials	Delivery services	Osnabrück	1871	Logistics	P	A
Henkel	Conglomerates	-	Düsseldorf	1876	Consumer goods, industrial goods	P	A
Henn	Industrials	Business support services	Munich	1979	Architecture	P	A
Hensoldt	Industrials	Aerospace & defense	Taufkirchen	2017	Avionics, electronics, telecommunications equipment	P	A
Heraeus	Industrials	Diversified industrials	Hanau	1851	Metals, medical technology, quartz glass, sensors, electronic components	P	A
Hermle	Industrials	Industrial machinery	Gosheim	1938	Universal machines	P	A
Herrenknecht	Industrials	Industrial machinery	Schwanau	1975	Tunnel boring machines	P	A
Hochtief	Industrials	Heavy construction	Essen	1874	Construction	P	A
Hoechst	Basic materials	Speciality chemicals	Frankfurt	1863	Chemicals, pharmaceuticals, defunct 2004, merged into Sanofi (France)	P	D
Howaldtswerke-Deutsche Werft	Industrials	Shipbuilding	Kiel	1838	Shipbuilding, defense	P	A
Hörmann	Industrials	General industrials	Steinhagen	1935	Door production and installation	P	A
Hubert Burda Media	Consumer services	Publishing	Offenburg	1903	Publishing and mass media	P	A
Hugo Boss	Consumer goods	Clothing & accessories	Metzingen	1924	Clothing	P	A
HypoVereinsbank	Financials	Financial services	Munich	1998	Finance and insurance, part of UniCredit (Italy)	P	A
IAV	Consumer goods	Auto parts	Berlin	1983	Automotive supplier	P	A
IFA Group	Consumer goods	Auto parts	Haldensleben	1959	Automotive supplier	P	A
IG Farben	Conglomerates	-	Frankfurt	1925	Chemicals, pharmaceuticals, Defunct 2012	P	D
IGEL Technology	Technology	Software	Bremen	2001	Software	P	A
Infineon Technologies	Technology	Semiconductors	Neubiberg	1999	Semiconductor manufacturer	P	A
Ingenhoven Associates	Industrials	Business support services	Düsseldorf	1985	Architecture	P	A
J. Schmalz	Industrials	Industrial machinery	Glatten	1910	Vacuum technology	P	A
Jenoptik	Industrials	Electronic equipment	Jena	1991	Optoelectronics engineering	P	A
Jopp Group	Consumer goods	Auto parts	Bad Neustadt an der Saale	1919	Automotive supplier	P	A
Junghans	Consumer goods	Clothing & accessories	Schramberg	1861	Watches	P	A
Jungheinrich	Industrials	Industrial machinery	Hamburg	1953	Material handling equipment	P	A
Junkers	Industrials	Aerospace	Dessau	1895	Aircraft manufacturer, defunct 1969	P	D
K+S	Basic materials	Speciality chemicals	Kassel	1889	Fertilisers	P	A
Kapp Niles	Industrials	Industrial machinery	Coburg	1953	Machine tools	P	A
Kärcher	Industrials	Industrial machinery	Winnenden	1935	Cleaning equipment manufacturer	P	A
Kasto	Industrials	Industrial machinery	Achern	1844	Machine manufacturer	P	A
Katjes International	Market	Food retailers & wholesalers	Emmerich am Rhein	1972	Sugar confectionery Market, part of Katjes Group	P	A
Kaufland	Consumer services	Food retailers & wholesalers	Neckarsulm	1985	Hypermarket, part of Schwarz Gruppe	P	A
Keimfarben	Basic materials	Speciality chemicals	Diedorf	1878	Paints	P	A
KfW	Financials	Banks	Frankfurt	1906	Financial services	P	A
KHS	Industrials	Industrial machinery	Dortmund	1993	Filling and packaging systems	P	A
KiK	Consumer services	Apparel retail	Bönen	1994	Clothing discount store, owned by Tengelmann Group	P	A
KION Group	Industrials	Industrial machinery	Frankfurt	2006	Materials handling equipment	P	A
Klöckner & Co	Basic materials	Iron & steel	Duisburg	1906	Metal distribution	P	A
KNDS Deutschland	Industrials	Defense	Munich	1999	Military vehicles	P	A
Knorr	Consumer goods	Food products	Heilbronn	1838	Food	P	A
Knorr-Bremse	Consumer goods	Auto parts	Munich	1905	Braking systems	P	A
Koenig & Bauer	Industrials	Industrial machinery	Würzburg	1817	Printing machines	P	A
Kölln	Consumer goods	Food products	Elmshorn	1820	Food	P	A
Körber	Industrials	Industrial machinery	Hamburg	1995	Mechanical engineering	P	A
KraussMaffei	Industrials	Industrial machinery	Munich	1931	Mechanical engineering	P	A
Krones	Industrials	Industrial machinery	Neutraubling	1951	Mechanical engineering	P	A
KSB	Industrials	Industrial machinery	Frankenthal	1871	Mechanical engineering	P	A
KUKA	Industrials	Industrial machinery	Augsburg	1898	Automation	P	A
KW Automotive	Consumer goods	Auto parts	Fichtenberg	1992	Automotive parts	P	A
Lamy	Consumer goods	Nondurable household products	Heidelberg	1930	Writing instruments	P	A
Landesbank Baden-Württemberg	Financials	Banks	Stuttgart	1999	Banking and financial services	P	A
Lanxess	Basic materials	Speciality chemicals	Cologne	2004	Chemicals	P	A
Leica Camera	Consumer goods	Consumer electronics	Wetzlar	1914	Cameras, optical imaging	P	A
Leica Microsystems	Industrials	Electronic equipment	Wetzlar	1997	Microscopes	P	A
Leistritz	Industrials	Industrial machinery	Nuremberg	1905	Turbine components, pumps, production technology	P	A
Leoni	Industrials	Electrical components & equipment	Nuremberg	1917	Cable and harnessing manufacturing	P	A
Lidl	Consumer services	Food retailers & wholesalers	Neckarsulm	1930	Part of Schwarz Gruppe	P	A
Liebherr	Industrials	Industrial machinery	Bulle	1949	Mechanical engineering	P	A
Lindauer Dornier	Industrials	Industrial machinery	Lindau	1985	Textile machinery manufacturer	P	A
Linde	Basic materials	Speciality chemicals	Munich	1879	Industrial gas production and plant engineering	P	A
Loesche	Basic materials	General mining	Düsseldorf	1906	Vertical roller mills for grinding coal, industrial minerals and ores.	P	A
Loewe	Consumer goods	Consumer electronics	Kronach	1923	Consumer electronics	P	A
Lohmann	Basic materials	Speciality chemicals	Neuwied	1851	Adhesive tapes	P	A
Lufthansa Group	Consumer services	Airlines	Cologne	1955	Largest German airline	P	A
Lürssen	Industrials	Shipbuilding	Bremen-Vegesack	1875	Shipyard, defense	P	A
Magirus	Industrials	Commercial vehicles & trucks	Ulm	1866	Trucks and industrial vehicles	P	A
Mahle Behr	Consumer goods	Auto parts	Stuttgart	1905	Automotive air conditioning and cooling system, part of Mahle	P	A
Mahle	Consumer goods	Auto parts	Stuttgart	1920	Automotive parts	P	A
MAN	Industrials	Commercial Vehicles & Trucks	Munich	1758	Automotive, mechanical engineering, part of Volkswagen Group	P	A
Mankenberg	Industrials	Industrial machinery	Lübeck	1885	Industrial valves	P	A
Mann+Hummel	Consumer goods	Auto parts	Ludwigsburg	1941	Liquid and air filter systems	P	A
Mannesmann	Conglomerates	-	Düsseldorf	1890	Defunct 2001, now part of Vodafone, ThyssenKrupp, Siemens, Salzgitter	P	D
Manz	Industrials	Industrial machinery	Reutlingen	1987	Integrated production lines	P	A
Maschinenfabrik Herkules	Industrials	Industrial machinery	Siegen	1911	Mechanical engineering	P	A
Mauser Jagdwaffen	Industrials	Defense	Isny im Allgäu	1999	Firearms	P	A
Medac	Health care	Pharmaceuticals	Wedel	1970	Pharmaceuticals	P	A
MediaMarkt	Consumer services	Specialty retailers	Ingolstadt	1979	Electronics retailing, owned by Ceconomy	P	A
Medion	Consumer goods	Consumer electronics	Essen	1983	Consumer electronics	P	A
Meggle	Consumer goods	Food products	Wasserburg am Inn	1887	Dairy	P	A
Mennekes	Industrials	Electrical components & equipment	Kirchhundem	1935	Industrial plugs and connectors	P	A
Mercedes-AMG	Consumer goods	Automobiles	Affalterbach	1967	Automobile and engine manufacturing, part of Mercedes-Benz Group	P	A
Mercedes-Benz	Consumer goods	Automobiles	Stuttgart	1883	Automotive, part of Mercedes-Benz Group	P	A
Mercedes-Benz Group	Consumer goods	Automobiles	Stuttgart	2007	Automotive	P	A
Merck	Health care	Pharmaceuticals	Darmstadt	1668	Pharmaceuticals	P	A
Messer	Basic materials	Speciality chemicals	Bad Soden	1898	Industrial gases	P	A
Messerschmitt	Industrials	Aerospace	Augsburg	1938	Aircraft manufacturer, defunct 1968, merged into Messerschmitt-Bölkow-Blohm	P	D
Messerschmitt-Bölkow-Blohm	Industrials	Aerospace	Ottobrunn	1968	Aircraft manufacturer, defunct 1989, merged into DASA	P	D
Metro	Consumer services	Broadline retailers	Düsseldorf	1964	Diversified retailer	P	A
Metz	Consumer goods	Consumer electronics	Zirndorf	1938	Electronics, defunct 2014	P	D
Meyer Werft	Industrials	Shipbuilding	Papenburg	1795	Shipbuilding	P	A
MHP	Technology	Software and computer services	Ludwigsburg	1996	Consultancy specialized in IT and process consulting, owned by Porsche	P	A
Miele	Consumer goods	Consumer electronics	Gütersloh	1899	Domestic appliances	P	A
Möller Group	Consumer goods	Auto parts	Bielefeld	1730	Automotive supplier	P	A
MTU Aero Engines	Industrials	Aerospace & defense	Munich	1934	Aircraft engines manufacturer	P	A
MTU Friedrichshafen	Industrials	Industrial machinery	Friedrichshafen	1909	Internal combustion engines and generators	P	A
Munich Re	Financials	Reinsurance	Munich	1880	Reinsurance	P	A
Müller	Consumer services	Drug retailers	Ulm	1953	Pharmacy and perfumery retail chains	P	A
Müller	Consumer goods	Food products	Fischach	1896	Dairy	P	A
Nemetschek	Technology	Software	Munich	1963	Software	P	A
Nero	Technology	Software	Karlsruhe	1995	Software	P	A
Netto Marken-Discount	Consumer services	Food retailers & wholesalers	Maxhütte-Haidhof	1984	Supermarkets, part of Edeka	P	A
New Yorker	Consumer goods	Apparel retail	Braunschweig	1971	Apparel and accessory retail	P	A
Nixdorf Computer	Technology	Computer hardware	Paderborn	1952	Computer manufacturer, defunct 1990	P	D
Norddeutsche Landesbank	Financials	Banks	Hanover	1970	Bank	P	A
Norma	Consumer services	Food retailers & wholesalers	Fürth	1964	Food discount store	P	A
NSU Motorenwerke	Consumer goods	Automobiles	Neckarsulm	1873	Now part of Audi, defunct	P	D
Obi	Consumer services	Home improvement retailers	Wermelskirchen	1970	DIY store, owned by Tengelmann Group	P	A
OHB	Industrials	Aerospace & defense	Bremen	1981	Aerospace technology	P	A
Opel	Consumer goods	Automobiles	Rüsselsheim am Main	1862	Automotive	P	A
Orenstein & Koppel	Industrials	Commercial vehicles & trucks	Berlin	1876	Defunct 1999	P	D
Osram	Industrials	Electrical components & equipment	Munich	1919	Lighting systems	P	A
Osram Opto Semiconductors	Technology	Semiconductors	Regensburg	1999	LEDs, optical sensors manufacturer	P	A
Otto Group	Consumer services	Broadline retailers	Hamburg	1949	Mail order company	P	A
Ottobock	Health care	Medical equipment	Duderstadt	1919	Wheel chairs, prosthetics	P	A
PCC	Basic materials	Speciality chemicals	Duisburg	1993	Chemicals, energy, logistics	P	A
Peek & Cloppenburg	Consumer goods	Apparel retail	Düsseldorf	1900	Apparel retail	P	A
Pelikan	Consumer goods	Nondurable household products	Hanover	1838	Writing instruments	P	A
Penny	Consumer services	Food retailers & wholesalers	Cologne	1973	Supermarkets, part of REWE Group	P	A
Pfeiffer Vacuum	Industrials	Industrial machinery	Wetzlar	1890	Vacuum pumps, measurement and components	P	A
Phoenix Contact	Industrials	Industrial machinery	Blomberg	1923	Automation	P	A
Phoenix Pharmahandel	Consumer services	Drug retailers	Mannheim	1994	Pharmacy retail chains	P	A
Porsche	Consumer goods	Automobiles	Stuttgart	1931	High performance vehicles, part of Volkswagen Group	P	A
Porsche SE	Conglomerates	-	Stuttgart	1931	Automotive holding company, majority shares in Volkswagen Group	P	A
ProSiebenSat.1	Consumer services	Broadcasting & entertainment	Unterföhring	2000	Mass media	P	A
Puma	Consumer goods	Clothing & accessories	Herzogenaurach	1948	Shoes & sports apparel & accessories manufacturer	P	A
Recaro	Consumer goods	Auto parts	Stuttgart	1906	Vehicle seating	P	A
Rehau Group	Industrials	Plastics	Rehau	1948	Polymer-based products manufacturer	P	A
Reis Robotics	Industrials	Industrial machinery	Obernburg	1957	Automation equipment	P	A
Renk	Industrials	Industrial engineering	Augsburg	1873	Gear units and drive systems	P	A
REWE Group	Consumer services	Food retailers & wholesalers	Cologne	1927	Supermarkets, retail	P	A
Rheinmetall	Conglomerates	-	Düsseldorf	1889	Aerostructure, automotive, defense, engineering, security	P	A
Röchling	Industrials	Plastics	Mannheim	1822	Plastics engineering	P	A
Rodenstock	Health care	Medical equipment	Munich	1877	Optical lenses and eyewear	P	A
Rohde & Schwarz	Industrials	Electronic equipment	Munich	1933	Electronic testing, radiocommunications devices	P	A
Röhm	Industrials	Industrial machinery	Sontheim an der Brenz	1909	Chucking tools	P	A
Röhm GmbH	Basic materials	Speciality chemicals	Darmstadt	2019	Chemicals	P	A
Rollei	Consumer goods	Consumer electronics	Hamburg	1920	Cameras and other optical equipment	P	A
ROSE Bikes	Consumer goods	Recreational products	Bocholt	1907	Bicycles	P	A
Rossmann	Consumer services	Drug retailers	Burgwedel	1972	Pharmacy retail chains	P	A
Rotring	Consumer goods	Nondurable household products	Hamburg	1928	Drawing tools, writing instruments	P	A
RRI Rhein Ruhr International	Industrials	Heavy construction	Essen	1942	Construction, engineering	P	A
RWE	Utilities	Electricity	Essen	1898	Electric generation and distribution	P	A
RWS	Industrials	Defense	Fürth	1886	Ammunition	P	A
Sachtleben Chemie	Basic materials	Speciality chemicals	Duisburg	1892	Chemicals	P	A
Salzgitter	Basic materials	Iron & steel	Salzgitter	1937	Steel producer	P	A
Samson AG	Industrials	Industrial machinery	Frankfurt	1907	Control valves	P	A
SAP	Technology	Software	Walldorf	1972	Enterprise software	P	A
Sartorius	Health care	Medical equipment	Göttingen	1870	Pharmaceutical and laboratory equipment	P	A
Saturn	Consumer services	Specialty retailers	Ingolstadt	1961	Electronics retailing, owned by Ceconomy	P	A
Schaeffler Group	Industrials	Industrial machinery	Herzogenaurach	1946	Mechanical parts	P	A
Schering	Health care	Pharmaceuticals	Berlin	1851	Defunct 2006, now part of Bayer	P	D
Schmitz Cargobull	Industrials	Commercial Vehicles & Trucks	Horstmar	1892	Trailers and truck bodies	P	A
Schneider Kreuznach	Technology	Electronic Components	Bad Kreuznach	1913	Industrial and photographic optics	P	A
Schott	Basic materials	Glass	Mainz	1884	Industrial glass	P	A
Schuler Group	Industrials	Industrial machinery	Göppingen	1839	Mechanical engineering	P	A
Schunk	Industrials	Industrial machinery	Lauffen am Neckar	1945	Gripping systems, clamping technology	P	A
Schunk Group	Industrials	Diversified industrials	Heuchelheim	1913	Components and systems for various industrial sectors	P	A
Schwan-Stabilo	Consumer goods	Nondurable household products	Heroldsberg	1855	Writing instruments	P	A
Schwarz Gruppe	Consumer services	Food retailers & wholesalers	Neckarsulm	1973	Supermarket holding company	P	A
Schwind eye-tech-solutions	Health care	Medical equipment	Kleinostheim	1958	Medical technology	P	A
Seeburger	Technology	Software	Bretten	1986	Software	P	A
Selgros	Consumer services	Food retailers & wholesalers	Neu-Isenburg	1959	Cash & carry stores, owned by Coop (Switzerland)	P	A
Semikron	Industrials	Electrical Components	Nuremberg	1951	Power semiconductor components	P	A
Sennheiser	Consumer goods	Consumer electronics	Wedemark	1945	Audio electronics	P	A
Setra	Industrials	Commercial vehicles & trucks	Neu-Ulm	1951	Automotive, part of Mercedes-Benz Group	P	A
SEW Eurodrive	Industrials	Industrial machinery	Bruchsal	1931	Electric motors, components	P	A
SGL Carbon	Basic materials	Speciality chemicals	Wiesbaden	1992	Carbon-based products	P	A
Sick AG	Technology	Electronic equipment	Waldkirch	1946	Industrial sensors and automation solutions	P	A
Siemens	Conglomerates	-	Munich	1847	Computing, energy, engineering, healthcare equipment, home appliances, industrials, mobility	P	A
Siemens Energy	Industrials	Industrial machinery	Munich	2020	Electrical engineering	P	A
Siemens Healthineers	Health care	Medical equipment	Munich	2020	Medical technology manufacturer, part of Siemens	P	A
Siemens Mobility	Industrials	Railroad equipment	Munich	2020	Rolling stock manufacturer, railway management, part of Siemens	P	A
SIG Sauer	Industrials	Defense	Eckernförde	1976	Firearms, defunct 2020	P	D
Signal Iduna	Financials	Full line insurance	Dortmund/Hamburg	1907	Insurance	P	A
Siltronic	Technology	Electronic Components	Munich	1968	Wafers made of silicon	P	A
Singulus Technologies	Industrials	Industrial machinery	Kahl am Main	1995	Manufacturing equipment	P	A
SLM Solutions Group	Industrials	Industrial machinery	Lübeck	2006	3D metal printers	P	A
Smart	Consumer goods	Automobiles	Böblingen	1994	Automotive, part of Mercedes-Benz Group	P	A
Software	Technology	Software	Darmstadt	1969	Enterprise software	P	A
Stada Arzneimittel	Health care	Pharmaceuticals	Bad Vilbel	1895	Pharmaceuticals	P	A
Staedtler	Consumer goods	Nondurable household products	Nuremberg	1835	Writing instruments	P	A
Stiebel Eltron	Industrials	General industrials	Holzminden	1924	Heat pumps, water heaters, and heating systems	P	A
Stihl	Industrials	Industrial machinery	Waiblingen	1926	Forestry equipment, gardening tools	P	A
Storck	Consumer goods	Food products	Berlin	1903	Confectionery	P	A
Südzucker	Consumer goods	Food products	Mannheim	1926	Sugar	P	A
SUSE	Technology	Software	Nuremberg	1992	Software	P	A
Suss Microtec	Industrials	Industrial machinery	Garching	1949	Equipment for semiconductor manufacturing	P	A
Symrise	Basic materials	Specialty chemicals	Holzminden	2003	Flavours, gustatory and cosmetic substances	P	A
T-Systems	Technology	Software and computer services	Frankfurt	2000	Part of Deutsche Telekom	P	A
Talanx	Financials	Full line insurance	Hanover	1996	Commercial insurance	P	A
Tchibo	Consumer services	Specialty retailers	Hamburg	1949	Coffee shops	P	A
TeamViewer	Technology	Software	Göppingen	2005	Software	P	A
Tegut	Consumer services	Food retailers & wholesalers	Fulda	1947	Supermarket chain owned by Migros (Switzerland)	P	A
Telefunken	Consumer goods	Consumer electronics	Berlin	1903	Defunct 1967	P	D
Telekom Deutschland	Telecommunications	Telecommunications services	Bonn	1992	Telecommunications, part of Deutsche Telekom	P	A
Tengelmann Group	Consumer services	Broadline retailers	Mülheim	1867	Retail holding company	P	A
Tesa SE	Industrials	Nondurable household products	Norderstedt	2001	Adhesives, owned by Beiersdorf	P	A
Thonet GmbH	Consumer goods	Furniture	Frankenberg	1853	Household furniture manufacturer	P	A
ThyssenKrupp	Conglomerates	-	Essen	1999	Defense, engineering, industrials, shipyards, steel	P	A
Trumpf	Industrials	Industrial machinery	Ditzingen	1923	Machine tools	P	A
TÜV Rheinland	Industrials	Business support services	Cologne	1872	Testing, inspection and certification services	P	A
Tuxedo Computers	Technology	Computer hardware	Augsburg	2004	Computer hardware and software	P	A
UHU	Industrials	Nondurable household products	Bühl	1884	Adhesives	P	A
Uniper	Utilities	Electricity	Düsseldorf	2016	State-owned energy company	S	A
United Internet	Telecommunications	Fixed line telecommunications	Montabaur	1988	ISP	P	A
Vaillant Group	Industrials	General industrials	Remscheid	1874	Heating systems	P	A
Varta	Industrials	Electronic equipment	Ellwangen	1887	Batteries	P	A
Vector Informatik	Technology	Software	Stuttgart	1988	Software	P	A
Vereinigte Flugtechnische Werke	Industrials	Aerospace	Bremen	1964	Defunct 1981	P	D
Vetter Pharma	Health care	Pharmaceuticals	Ravensburg	1950	Pharmaceutical contract manufacturing and packaging	P	A
Viessmann	Industrials	General industrials	Allendorf (Eder)	1917	Heating systems	P	A
Villeroy & Boch	Consumer goods	Durable household products	Mettlach	1748	Ceramics	P	A
Viscom	Industrials	Electronic equipment	Hanover	1984	Inspection technologies	P	A
Vitesco Technologies	Consumer goods	Auto parts	Regensburg	2019	Automotive parts	P	A
Voith	Industrials	Industrial machinery	Heidenheim an der Brenz	1867	Mechanical engineering	P	A
Volkswagen Group	Consumer goods	Automobiles	Wolfsburg	1937	Automotive	P	A
Vonovia	Financials	Real estate	Bochum	2001	Real estate	P	A
Vossloh	Industrials	Industrial transportation	Werdohl	1888	Railway systems engineering	P	A
Wacker Chemie	Basic materials	Speciality chemicals	Munich	1914	Silicon & polymer based products	P	A
Wacker Neuson	Industrials	Machinery: Construction & handling	Munich	1848	Construction equipment	P	A
WAGO Kontakttechnik	Industrials	Electrical components & equipment	Minden	1951	Electrical components	P	A
WaldrichSiegen	Industrials	Industrial machinery	Siegen	1840	Heavy duty machine tools	P	A
Webasto	Consumer goods	Auto parts	Stockdorf	1901	Automotive supplier	P	A
Wera Tools	Consumer goods	Durable household products	Wuppertal	1936	Hand tools	P	A
Werner & Mertz	Consumer goods	Personal products	Mainz	1867	Chemical industry	P	A
Weser Flugzeugbau	Industrials	Aerospace	Bremen	1934	Defunct 1964	P	D
Wieland	Basic materials	Nonferrous metals	Ulm	1820	Metal industry	P	A
WIKA	Industrials	Electronic equipment	Klingenberg am Main	1946	Measuring equipment	P	A
Wilkhahn	Consumer goods	Furniture	Bad Münder	1907	Office furniture manufacturer	P	A
Wilo	Industrials	Industrial machinery	Dortmund	1872	Pumps and pump systems	P	A
Wintershall Dea	Energy	Oil & gas	Kassel	1894	Oil and gas producer	P	A
Witte Automotive	Consumer goods	Auto parts	Velbert	1899	Automotive supplier	P	A
Wittenstein	Industrials	Industrial machinery	Igersheim	1949	Mechanical engineering	P	A
WMF	Consumer goods	Durable household products	Geislingen an der Steige	1853	Cookware	P	A
Wolff & Müller	Industrials	Heavy construction	Stuttgart	1936	Construction	P	A
Wortmann	Technology	Computer hardware	Hüllhorst	1986	Computer & accessories manufacturer	P	A
Wörwag Pharma	Health care	Pharmaceuticals	Böblingen	1971	Pharmaceuticals	P	A
Würth	Industrials	General industrials	Künzelsau	1945	Fasteners	P	A
X-Fab	Technology	Semiconductors	Erfurt	1992	Semiconductor components	P	A
Zalando	Technology	Internet	Berlin	2008	Online fashion retail (e-commerce)	P	A
ZF Friedrichshafen	Consumer goods	Auto parts	Friedrichshafen	1915	Automotive parts	P	A
Ziehl-Abegg	Industrials	Electrical components & equipment	Künzelsau	1910	Electrical components	P	A
Zott	Consumer goods	Food products	Mertingen	1926	Dairy	P	A
Zwilling J. A. Henckels	Consumer goods	Durable household products	Solingen	1731	Kitchenware	P	A

== See also ==
- Category:Companies of Germany
- List of largest German companies
