= Rohm (disambiguation) =

Rohm is a Japanese semiconductor manufacturer.

Rohm, Roehm, (and variants as to casing and/or diacritical marks) also may refer to:

== People bearing such a name ==
- Elisabeth Röhm (born 1973), German/American television actress
- Maria Rohm (1945–2018), Austrian actress
- Otto Röhm (1876–1939), founder of the American chemical company Rohm and Haas
- Ernst Röhm (1887–1934), purged and murdered German commander and cofounder of the Nazi SA (Stormtroopers)
- Jair-Rôhm Parker Wells (born 1958) American jazz musician

== Institutions ==
- ROHM (the Royal Opera House Muscat), operatic venue in Muscat, Oman
- Industrial enterprises:
  - RÖHM GmbH, German chucking tool manufacturer
  - Röhm (RG), manufacturer of firearms sometimes known as "RG"
  - Rohm and Haas, American chemical company
  - Röhm GmbH (Darmstadt), German chemical company

== See also ==
- ROLM, a former technology company
