= Helpcheck =

- Type: Private Company
- Industry: Legal Tech
- Founded: 2016
- Founders: Peer Schulz and Phil Sokowicz
- Headquarters: Düsseldorf, Germany
- Website: Helpcheck

Helpcheck is a legal tech company from Düsseldorf. The company was founded in 2016 by Peer Schulz and Phil Sokowicz as a “justice-as-a-service” platform for consumer rights, providing people with access to justice, in the life insurance sector. Since 2025, the firm has focused on traffic law.

== Developments ==
The startup raised €13 million from a German family office. The start-up sees new opportunities through a recent ruling by the European Court of Justice (ECJ) on the revocation of credit agreements. Helpcheck enables consumers to obtain their legitimate claims that are denied by insurance companies. The legal tech maintains a digital platform integrating lawyers and industry experts. In 2025, the focus shifted to traffic law. helpecheck helps users challenge traffic fines, driving bans, and points in Flensburg.

== Legal battle ==
Customers who took out life insurance between 1994 and 2007 and are dissatisfied with the return on the contract may still be able to withdraw the policy to date. In addition to the contributions paid, the customer will then also receive back the interest accrued on them. The background is a 2014 ruling by the Federal Court of Justice, according to which insured persons may revoke a contract if the provider has not informed them of their right to object or has only insufficiently informed them (Az: IV ZR 76/11).

== See also ==
- List of companies of Germany
