= Loesche =

Engineering company

Loesche GmbH
- Company type: Gesellschaft mit beschränkter Haftung
- Industry: Conglomerate
- Founded: 1906 (Berlin)
- Founder: Curt von Grueber; Ernst Curt Loesche
- Headquarters: Düsseldorf, Germany
- Area served: Worldwide
- Key people: Dr. Thomas Loesche (Managing Partner and Owner in 3rd Generation); Mr. Rüdiger Zerbe (Managing Director)
- Products: Dry Grinding Plants, Container Grinding Plants, Hot Gas Generators, Dynamic Classifiers, Thermal Applications, Automation
- Services: EPC/Turn Key, Engineering, Consulting and Technical Field Service
- Number of employees: 850 (2013)
- Divisions: Cement Industry, Power Industry, Steel Industry, Industrial mineral Industry, Mining Industry
- Website: www.loesche.com

Loesche GmbH is an owner-managed engineering company founded in Berlin in 1906 and currently based in Düsseldorf, Germany that designs, manufactures and services vertical roller mills for grinding of coal, cement raw materials, granulated slag, industrial minerals and ores. At present, more than 400 people are working for Loesche in Germany and around 850 are employed worldwide.

In addition to its new subsidiary in Indonesia, Loesche has operations in Brazil, China, India, Russia, South Africa, Nigeria, Spain, United Arab Emirates, United Kingdom and United States, and it's represented by agents in more than 30 countries.

== Company history ==
Ernst Curt Loesche - Founder of Loesche GmbH

In 1906, the engineer Curt von Grueber established a company for the design and sale of Kent mills in Berlin. Curt von Grueber Technisches Bureau – the forerunner of Loesche GmbH –was a manufacturer of cement and phosphate mills. In 1912, the company began manufacturing its products in its own manufacturing facility, initially in Berlin-Hohenschönhausen and later in Berlin-Teltow. Its range of products included Maxecon mills, Hauenschild rotary grate kilns, and all kinds of machinery for cement production, including crushers and screw conveyors.

In July 1912 Ernst Curt Loesche joined the company as a young engineer. He soon worked his way up through the ranks to a management position and became a partner in the company in 1919.

Despite the fact that the German cement industry found itself in a deep and sustained crisis after the First World War, Curt von Grueber Technisches Bureau managed to stay afloat by supplying new coal-fired power stations with mills. In 1927, Ernst Curt Loesche developed the Loesche mill for the Klingenberg power station in Berlin-Rummelsburg and in 1937, Ernst Curt Loesche bought Curt von Grueber's share in the company and became sole owner.

The outbreak of the Second World War was a caesura in the history of Ernst Curt Loesche's company. As was the case with many other machine manufacturers, the company was obliged to produce armaments for the German war effort: the Reich Air Ministry soon replaced the cement industry as the company's largest customer. Following a damaging air raid in 1943, production at the Teltow works very nearly ground to a halt. In 1945, at the end of the war, the Soviet occupation forces insisted that the company's machinery in Teltow be dismantled and transported to the Soviet Union. Only a few months later, the company was back in business working with out-dated machinery.

After the expropriation of the Berlin works, Ernst Curt Loesche and some of the employees who had worked for him in Berlin began rebuilding the company, which was now known as Loesche Hartzerkleinerungs- und Zementmaschinen KG, in a ruined building in Düsseldorf in the summer of 1948. When Ernst Curt Loesche died unexpectedly in November of the same year, his son, Ernst Guenter, took over the business. Under his leadership and with its own manufacturing facility in Neuss, Loesche KG re-established itself in the 1950s and after 35 years as managing director of the company, Ernst Guenter Loesche retired in late 1983.

With Dr. Thomas Loesche at the helm, the third generation of the Loesche family is now managing the company. In 1992 the company moved into a new, larger office building on Hansaallee.

The collapse of economies in South-East Asia in 1997 plunged the company into a deep crisis. However, new ideas and the introduction of a series of rationalization measures enabled the company to recover.

On August 1, 2008, Loesche GmbH founded Loesche Automation GmbH. The new company was active in the distribution and further development of the Loesche Industrial Automation product for crushing plants.

In 2013, Loesche opened two new subsidiaries, one in Jakarta, Indonesia.

== Products ==
- Vertical roller mills for cement raw material–with two, three, four and six rollers, these mills were used for the first time in the 1930s to grind cement raw material.
- Vertical roller mills for cement clinker and blast furnace slag–vertical roller mills are traditionally used for processing granulated blastfurnace slag and for grinding composite cements. The first use of one of the company's mills with a grinding-track diameter of just 1.1 m for grinding cement clinker had already been recorded back in 1935.
- Vertical roller mills for solid fuels
- Containerised coal grinding plant CGPmobile
- Mobile ore-grinding plant OGPmobile
- Loesche Mill LM 70.4+4
- Other products include: vertical roller mills for ores and minerals, vertical roller mills for industrial minerals, dynamic classifiers. and hot gas generators.

== Partnerships and Acquisitions ==
In 2012 Loesche GmbH and pyroprocessing specialist A TEC Holding GmbH of Austria have entered into a close cooperation agreement.

In 2013 Loesche acquires the majority of stakes in the aixprocess and aixergee engineering companies based in Aachen, Germany. Aixergee GmbH is specialised in the optimisation of production processes in the cement industry in the areas of alternative fuel firing, performance improvement, emissions reduction and stabilisation of plant operation. Aixprocess GmbH develops models and tools for the simulation of complex process- and flow-relevant processes from the power plant and process engineering sectors.

Renk AG, Augsburg/Germany and Loesche GmbH, Duesseldorf/Germany agree on exclusivity of the COPE drive concept for vertical roller mills. The COPE gearbox is primarily available for mill outputs between 4000 and 12 000 kW and represents a highly redundant innovative drive system for large and very large vertical mills.

== Additional References ==
- Brundiek, Horst. Die Geschichte der Loesche-Mühle, manuscript.
- Brundiek, Horst, Kohlenmühlen un mittlere Lesitungen (Problemstellungen und Problemlösungen an Fallbeidpielen), paper given at the conference "Technik im Gespräch" in Düsseldorf, 17 March 1982
- Brundiek, Horst, "Horst Brundiek - The Father of the 4-Roller-Mill", special edition Zement-Kalk-Gips, 2000
- Curt von Grueber Maschinenbau Aktiengesellschaft Berlin, Special print-out from the Deutsches Wirtschaftarchiv, date unknown.

Publication commemorating the 75th anniversary of the foundation of the company, Düsseldorf, 1981
Fischer, Wolfram (publisher), Die Geschichte der Stromversorgung, Frankfurt a.M., 1992
Loesche E.G. and Frommelt, G, "Das moderne Schachtofenwerk Semen Kupang auf der Insel Timor /Indonesien", special edition of ZKG, year 37 (1984) no. 12, p. 3-7

- Verein Deutscher Zementwerke e.V. (publisher), 125 Jahre Forschung für Qualität und Fortschritt, Düsseldorf, 2002
