= Alb-Gold Teigwaren =

German food company

ALB-GOLD Teigwaren GmbH
- Type: GmbH
- Industry: Food industry
- Founded: 1968
- Headquarters: Trochtelfingen
- Key people: Irmgard Freidler
- Revenue: 95.63 million EUR (2020)
- Number of employees: 391

Alb‑Gold Teigwaren GmbH, or simply Alb‑Gold, is a German pasta manufacturer based in Trochtelfingen in the Reutlingen district, Baden-Württemberg, on the Swabian Jura. The pasta is sold under various brands.

== History ==
In 1968 Franz Freidler founded a farm selling poultry directly to consumers on the outskirts of Trochtelfingen. In 1977 Freidler's son Klaus joined the company and began producing noodles.

In 1993 Alb‑Gold took over the East German manufacturer Teigwaren Riesa. Since 1995 the family business has focused exclusively on the production of pasta. Around the turn of the millennium production capacity was expanded and a new distribution centre was opened. At the beginning of 2001 Alb‑Gold acquired the Bechtle pasta factory in Ammerbuch, which produced specialties such as Knöpfle. In 2002 Alb‑Gold opened a customer centre in Trochtelfingen. At the two sites Trochtelfingen and Riesa Alb‑Gold produced 15,000 t and 20,000 t of pasta per year respectively and was, by its own account, the second largest manufacturer in Germany in 2003.

Products include fresh Spätzle, Knöpfle, Maultasche and Schupfnudel, as well as pasta in classic Italian shapes. The range also includes ribbon pasta and both scraped and dried Spätzle.

Products were marketed mainly under the Riesa and Alb‑Gold brands in different segments. Since 2005 Alb‑Gold has also produced fresh pasta, and in 2007 Alb‑Gold took over the fresh‑pasta business of the Freiburg catering company Zahner.

After the death of Klaus Freidler on 18 June 2010, Alb‑Gold has been managed by his wife Irmgard and their sons Oliver and André Freidler. On 1 August 2012 Alb‑Gold took over the insolvent Seitz GmbH from Spaichingen, which was renamed "Spaichinger Nudelmacher" two years later. In 2015 the group employed around 420 people, about 180 of them at the Trochtelfingen headquarters. Revenue in 2015 was approximately €80 million. In 2018 Alb‑Gold acquired the Al dente Pasta Company in Whitmore Lake, Michigan, United States. Teigwaren Riesa GmbH was separated from the Alb‑Gold group on 14 September 2020 and in autumn 2023 80% of it was sold to the Irish investment company Biavest.
