= Seeburger =

German software company

- Type: Aktiengesellschaft
- Industry: Data integration
- Founded: 1986
- Founder: Bernd Seeburger
- Headquarters: Bretten, Germany
- Area served: North America, Europe, Middle East & Africa and Asia-Pacific
- Products: Business Integration Suite (BIS)
- Number of employees: 1,200 (2025)
- Website: seeburger.com

Seeburger AG (stylized as SEEBURGER) is a German enterprise software company founded in 1986 and headquartered in Bretten, Germany.

== History ==
Seeburger AG was founded in 1986 in Bretten, Germany. In 2025, board members Simone Zeuchner, Katrin Seeburger, and Ralph Jacoby were reappointed for another five-year term.
