= Peter Kölln =

German food company

Peter Kölln GmbH & Co. KGaA
- Company type: GmbH & Co. KGaA
- Industry: Food industry
- Founded: 1820
- Headquarters: Elmshorn, Schleswig-Holstein, Germany
- Key people: Friederike Driftmann, Björn Schulz, Manfred Vondran, Christian Diekmann
- Revenue: €145 million (2021)
- Number of employees: 400 (2021)

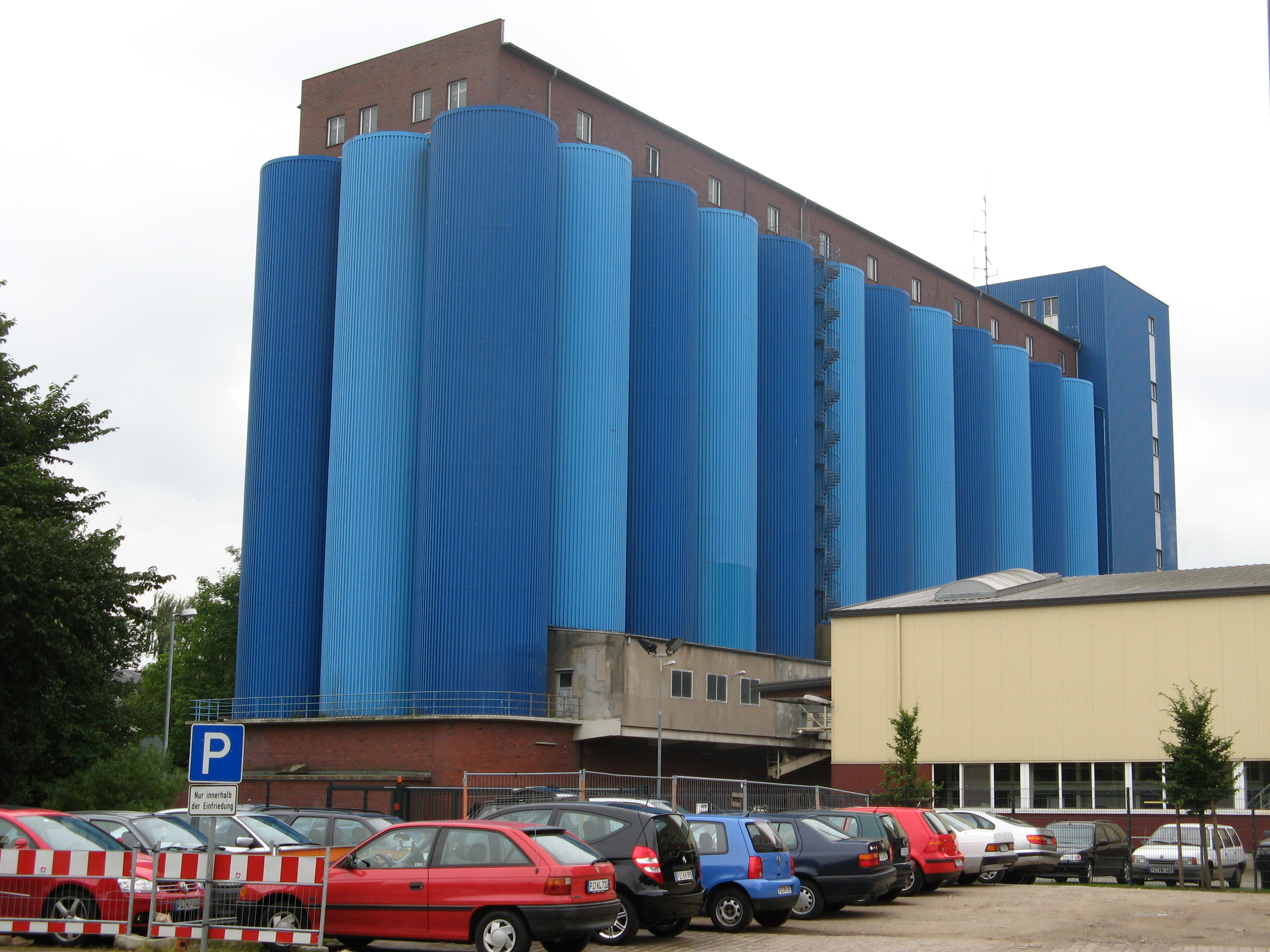
Younger part of the Kölln factory site

Peter Kölln GmbH & Co. KGaA, or simply Kölln, is a food company founded in 1820, best known for its rolled oats, heat-stable oils and fats, and edible oils. The company is headquartered in Elmshorn, Schleswig-Holstein, and remains family-owned.

== History ==
Hans Hinrich Kölln (1770–1812) bought a horse-driven gristmill in 1795 and produced ship's hardtack for sailors departing Elmshorn for Greenland. The business suffered during the wars following the French Revolution and the Continental System imposed by Napoleon I, but was continued by his widow after his death.

His son Peter Kölln (1796–1858) took over the mill and founded the present company in 1820. The founder's son replaced the old horse mill with a steam engine. Besides grain wholesale (the company's main business until the First World War), the Köllnflocken works developed into a major oat processor. A new mill was built in the 1870s and production capacity was expanded and modernised in subsequent decades. In 1937 the brand "blütenzarten Köllnflocken" (delicately soft Kölln flakes) in the dark-blue/light-blue packaging was registered as a trademark. The company later developed mueslis and other oat products such as rolled oats, oat bran flakes and instant flakes.

During the Second World War the company used prisoners of war and forced labourers.

Ernsthermann Kölln (24 March 1923 – 28 January 2020) was sole owner from 1956 to 1998, when he handed the business to his son‑in‑law Hans Heinrich Driftmann. He served as chairman of the supervisory board until 2015 and was honorary chairman until his death.

In 2004 the company acquired Pomps Kindergrieß and Edelweiss Milchzucker and the brands Livio, Biskin, Palmin and Becht's Speiseöl from Union Deutsche Lebensmittelwerke (then part of Unilever). In mid‑2009 the Livio brand licence for ketchup, mayonnaise and dressings was sold to Homann Feinkost (then owned by IFR Capital).

From 2014 to 2022 the company operated a flagship store called "Kölln Haferland" in Hamburg's Steinstraße, and from 2017 to 2022 a second shop "Kleines Haferland" operated in Westerland on Sylt. In 2015 Kölln acquired the Mazola brand from Unilever, strengthening its position as a market leader in cereals and edible oils and fats in Germany.

Since 2024 the company has been led by lawyer Friederike Driftmann‑Egelhof as chair of the management board and principal shareholder in the seventh generation.

== Shipping ==
For many years oats were delivered via the Krückau river and the now silted Elmshorn harbour. Four motor ships named Kornblume, Korngarbe, Kornähre and Klostersande sailed in Peter Kölln's house colours. The last departure of the Klostersande was on 21 November 2000. Since 2016 the Klostersande has been preserved as a museum ship in Elmshorn.

== Oat flake picture cards ==
For several decades collectible picture cards were included with oat packages. The cards were modelled on Liebig cards and the company operated an exchange centre; corresponding albums for pasting in the cards were published.
