= Otto Bihler Maschinenfabrik =

German manufacturing company

Otto Bihler Maschinenfabrik GmbH & Co. KG
- Type: Privately held company
- Industry: Welding, Punching Machine, Assembly technology
- Founded: 1958
- Headquarters: Halblech, Germany
- Key people: Mathias Bihler (CEO)
- Revenue: €119.4 million (2023/2024)
- Number of employees: 750 (2025/2026)
- Website: bihler.de

Otto Bihler Maschinenfabrik GmbH & Co. KG, or simply Bihler, is a German manufacturer of stamping, welding, and assembly systems headquartered in Halblech, Bavaria.

Bihler forming and assembly systems are used in various industrial sectors, including the electrical, automotive, and electronics industries. The machines enable the production of stamped and formed components as well as complete assemblies.

== History ==
The origins of Otto Bihler Maschinenfabrik date to 1953, when Otto Bihler began developing mechanical systems for spring and wire processing. In 1956, he introduced the RM 25 punching and bending machine, which arranged several forming units around a vertically oriented working surface. Its design made it possible to produce components made of wire or strip material using one machine.

This manufacturing method became known as the Bihler system, and the products made with it were referred to as Bihler parts. After presenting his machine at the Hannover Messe (Hanover Trade Fair) in 1957, Otto Bihler expanded production and established a small manufacturing facility in Halblech near Füssen.

In 1966, based in part on the RM 35, Bihler introduced a modular concept to allow variable applications in punching and bending machines. A second factory opened in Füssen in the 1970s and in 1980 Bihler of America, Inc. started operations from North Branch, New Jersey. By the mid-1980s, the company supplied machinery for different industrial applications, including the production of hooks, clips, and electrical components from wire and strip material. One product made by Bihler is a wire feeding unit, used to make the hairpins used in tractor motors, notably for cars. The RKZ 2.1 was one of two main units on the market, the other being made by rival company Witels-Albert GmbH. Academics assessed these units for the potential of robotic forming of hairpins, they noted their accuracy and compact design, but also commented that they were oversized for their robotic initiative, and had high investment costs.

After the death of Otto Bihler in 1995, management passed to his son, Mathias Bihler.

The company's first cam-controlled Bimeric CNC system was introduced in 2000. In 2011, Bihler cooperated with Freudenberg Sealing Technologies and Trumpf on a laser-based process for metal sealing rings that combined laser cutting, bending and welding. The project received the German Innovation Award.

In 2010, operations at the Austrian subsidiary Bihler Werkzeugtechnik in Weißenbach, Tyrol, which formed part of the toolmaking division, were discontinued. The company announced that it would lay off 75 staff at their Phillipsburg, New Jersey, plant from April 2025.

== Bihler as a generic term ==
The term Bihler parts (German: Bihler-Teile) has become a commonly used generic designation for stamped and bent components. Although such parts are produced by many manufacturers, the term derives from Otto Bihler's initial work in stamping and bending technology. The widespread adoption of this technology in the late 1950s led to the expression Bihler parts, referring to components made on machines of this type.

== Bibliography ==
- Hörmann, Vinzenz; Schäfer, Christoph (2013). Stanzbiegetechnik: Effiziente Fertigung von Stanzbiegeteilen und kompletten Baugruppen [Stamping and bending technology: Efficient production of stamped and bent parts and complete assemblies] (in German). Vol. 357. Munich: Süddeutscher Verlag onpact GmbH. p. 6. ISBN 978-3-86236-054-3.
- Hesse, Hannes; Langenscheidt, Florian; Rauen, Hartmut (2013). The Best of German Engineering: Das Lexikon des deutsche Maschinenbaus [The Best of German Engineering: The Encyclopedia of German Mechanical Engineering] (in German). VDMA — Mechanical Engineering Industry Association. pp. 147–149. ISBN 978-3816306467.
- Yogeshwar, Rangar (2019). TOP 100 2019: Innovationschampions [TOP 100 2019: Innovation Champions] (in German). Redline Wirtschaft. ISBN 9783962671525.
- Kolbe, Matthias (2020). Stanztechnik: Grundlagen · Werkzeuge · Maschinen [Punching technology: Basics — Tools — Machines] (in German) (13 ed.). Wiesbaden: Springer Science+Business Media. p. 275. ISBN 978-3-658-30400-3.
