= Mankenberg =

Mankenberg GmbH
- Company type: GmbH
- Industry: engineering
- Founded: 1885
- Founder: Gustav Mankenberg
- Headquarters: Lübeck, Germany
- Key people: Stefan Nehlsen (CEO)
- Number of employees: 185 Lübeck (end 2024)
- Website: www.mankenberg.de

Mankenberg GmbH is a manufacturer of industrial valves and supplies to various industries worldwide. The company's headquarters are located in Lübeck (Schleswig-Holstein, Germany).

The German company focuses on the production of self-acting control valves (pressure and level control) and, in addition to standard products, specialises in customised solutions. Managing Director is Dr. Stefan Nehlsen.

== History ==
The founder Gustav Mankenberg was born on August 12, 1857, in the town of Wittstock on the river Dosse/Germany as eighth child to the self-employed master blacksmith Johann Friedrich Mankenberg. He learnt the trade of a metal craftsman in Berlin, i.e. a craftsman processing metal objects of any kind by shaping, casting, turning and other processing methods.

On May 1, 1885, Gustav Mankenberg took over the workshop of the brass founder master Wallen in the town of Heide in Schleswig-Holstein and founded the company Gustav Mankenberg. Mr. Mankenberg quickly realised the development of the local market and changed the product line to reducing valves for air and carbonic acid tanks, air pumps etc. and additionally opened a samples stock and a sales warehouse at the Roedingsmarkt avenue in Hamburg.

Owing to non-payments caused by an economical slump in the building industry, Gustav Mankenberg was forced to bring a partner from Hamburg to the company in Heide in 1891. However, the co-operation failed.

While the company's building hardware division remained in Heide, in May 1895 - ten years after the company had been founded - Gustav Mankenberg started valve production in the Hanseatic city of Szczecin. The city is conveniently placed at the mouth of the river Oder as regards transport facilities with good connection to Berlin via the Finow Canal and later the Oder-Havel Canal. That location proved successful as well as the demand from factories and shipyards such as the renowned shipyard Vulcan Werft.

In 1904 Mankenberg had the Niagara patented: a steam trap with a closed ball float made of steel that was welded by means of the autogeneous welding procedure. Today the steam trap is still in the product range of Mankenberg GmbH. The name "Niagara" was intended to indicate the unusually large quantities of water that the new device could discharge.

Due to the increased requirement for space, Mankenberg relocated to the newly erected factory on the Wiekenberg road no. 12 in Szczecin in October 1910. Later, the adjoining properties Wiekenberg no. 14-17 and Kochstrasse 19 with a total area of 12,000 square metres were acquired.

On 1 January 1912 Gustav Mankenberg accepted his eldest son and employee for several years, Ewald Mankenberg, as a partner in the company. In his capacity as steam expert, he strengthened the company's consulting competence.

On 1 January 1917 the second son, Hellmuth Mankenberg, who had worked as a technical merchant until the First World War after thorough practical and theoretical training in Germany and abroad, joined the company as a partner. He had retired from front-line service due to a serious injury.

On 1 April 1919 Mankenberg transferred the company to his two sons Ewald and Hellmuth. He lived on the factory property until the complete bombing and destruction of his villa in August 1944 and died on 2 February 1945 in the German town of Greifswald at the age of 87.

In 1929 the economic crisis began: Inflation and deflation posed new challenges to the company.

During World War II the factory in Szczecin continued to fabricate steam valves until the eviction notice was received on March 23, 1945. The company had to be closed immediately. The company management was only allowed to take the finished products with them, all machine tools were not allowed to be loaded. The way led the company management and numerous employees to the Hanseatic city of Lübeck, where rooms were rented from the stamping and enamelling works.

In the summer of 1945 the company was given permission to resume production in Lübeck. After initial provisional arrangements with company premises at five different locations, the company acquired the site at Brolingstrasse 51 in 1955 and built its own administration building on the factory premises.

Dieter Mankenberg, one grandson of Gustav Mankenberg who was to take over the business later, was killed during WW II in Hungary in January 1945. Therefore, Dr.-Ing. Günther Weidner, son-in-law of Hellmuth Mankenberg, joined the company in 1954.

In 1957 the limited company Gustav Mankenberg Armaturenfabrik GmbH was founded in addition to the existing general partnership (German OHG). Dr.-Ing. Günther Weidner received power of attorney. All employees were taken over by the GmbH.

In 1967 the Lubeck-based graduate engineer Hermann Thomsen became head of the technical office. At the beginning of the 1970s, he also became a partner and sole responsible managing director of the company.

In 1992 the company moved to Spenglerstrasse no. 99 in the Lubeck-based industrial estate Roggenhorst.

In the year 2002 Mr Axel Weidner, Gustav Mankenberg's great-grandson, became the sole managing director of Mankenberg GmbH.

Mankenberg GmbH founded the subsidiary OOO Mankenberg in Moscow in 2014.

In 2017 Dr.-Ing. Stefan Nehlsen joined the company as second managing director.

== Awards ==
In 2010, Mankenberg was the best medium-sized company to win the Oskar Patzelt Foundation's Grand Prix for Medium-Sized Businesses. The jury praised Mankenberg's overall development during the previous year, the creation and safeguarding of jobs and training places, modernisation and innovation as well as its commitment to the region.

In 2011, Mankenberg became one of 365 places in the Land of Ideas. The location initiative "Germany – Land of Ideas", under the patronage of the Federal President of Germany, together with Deutsche Bank, awarded the prize to Mankenberg for its money box rallye project ("Spardosenrallye").
