= Röhm GmbH (Darmstadt) =

German chemicals company

Röhm
- Type: GmbH
- Industry: Chemical industry
- Founded: August 1, 2019
- Headquarters: Darmstadt, Germany
- Key people: Hans Bohnen, Hans-Peter Hauck, Martin Krämer (management board)
- Products: bulk monomers, molding Compounds, methacrylate resins, cyanides
- Revenue: ca. €1.6 billion (2023)
- Number of employees: ca. 2,850
- Website: roehm.com

Röhm GmbH is a German chemicals company headquartered in Darmstadt, Germany. Röhm employs around 2,850 employees at nine sites in Germany, the United States, China, and Mexico. In 2023, the company generated a revenue of €1.6 billion. Röhm GmbH was founded in 2019 through the carve-out of the Methacrylates Verbund and CyPlus GmbH from Evonik Industries. The company's history, through its predecessor entities, dates back to 1907.

== History ==
The origins of Röhm GmbH go back to the year 1907. At that time, the chemist, and entrepreneur Otto Röhm (1876–1939), together with the businessman Otto Haas (1872–1960), founded Röhm & Haas GmbH. In 1933, the company entered the then still young plastics industry with the development of a new type of acrylic glass (polymethyl methacrylate, PMMA), which later became known under the brand name Plexiglas. By the time of Otto Röhm's death in 1939, the company had over 1800 employees and an annual turnover of over RM22 million.

In the years after World War II, Plexiglas was increasingly used in everyday objects and architecture, which led to the growth of Röhm & Haas GmbH. After the Haas family sold their shares, the company operated under the name Röhm GmbH from 1971. In 1989, the company was taken over by Hüls AG, which later merged with Degussa AG and afterwards became the Degussa-Hüls AG. During that time, Röhm continued to operate as a subsidiary under its own name. In 1998, Röhm founded a subsidiary in the United States to expand its business in the country. With the formation of Evonik Industries AG in 2007, Röhm became a subsidiary company of it under the name Methacrylates Verbund.

As part of its strategic decisions, Evonik sold Röhm to the investment company Advent International in 2019. Since August 2019, the Methacrylates Verbund has again been operating under its original name Röhm GmbH. In 2023, the company opened a laboratory and research centre in Worms to pool research activities for all business units in one facility.

== Operations ==
The administrative headquarters are in Darmstadt, Germany. The company operates production facilities at nine locations on three continents. In Germany, Röhm produces in Worms, Hanau and Wesseling. Worms is the company's largest production site and has also been home to the company's research and innovation department since 2023.

In Asia, Röhm owns production sites in Shanghai. In the United States, there are production facilities in Wallingford (Connecticut), Westwego (Louisiana) and Osceola (Arkansas). As of October 2024, a new production facility in Bay City (Texas) was nearing completion. A further production facility on the American continent is located in Coatzacoalcos, Mexico. The headquarters for the American branch of Röhm have been located in Parsippany (New Jersey) since 2022.

== Brands and business segments ==
Röhm GmbH works on the development, production, and distribution of methacrylate monomers, methacrylate polymers, methacrylate resins and cyanides.

=== MMA ===
Since early 2020, Röhm has been selling MMAs under the Meracryl brand. They are used in the manufacture of paints and coatings, plastics, and industrial applications.

=== PMMA ===
Röhm sells PMMA products under the brands Plexiglas and Acrylite (the latter used in America). Röhm holds the trademark rights to the name Plexiglas in most of the world, except in North America. The material is used in cars, aircraft windows, screens and displays, as construction glazing, noise barriers, and the advertising industry.

Products of the Cyrolite brand are used for medical applications.

=== Methacrylate resins ===
Röhm produces methacrylate resins under the Degalan, Degadur and Degaroute brands for the production of binders for paints and coatings, industrial flooring, adhesives and road markings.

=== Cyanides ===
The company's cyanides are used for the extraction of precious metals in the mining industry.

== Innovation and sustainability ==
Since 2022, Röhm has been building a plant with a new technology in Bay City, Texas. The so-called "LiMA" technology stands for "Leading in Methacrylates" and involves a new production method for methacrylates. This production is designed to be more environmentally friendly than traditional production methods due to lower energy and water consumption. The production capacity is estimated at 250,000 tons per year.
