= Kasto =

Manufacturing company

Kasto Maschinenbau
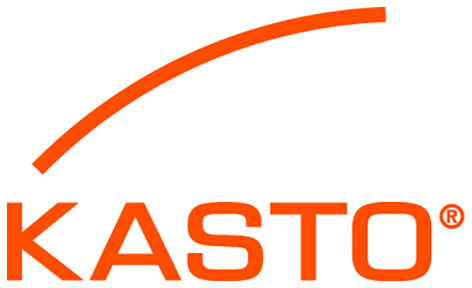
- Industry: Manufacturing
- Founded: 1844
- Headquarters: Achern, Germany
- Products: Metal Working Machines
- Revenue: 101.6 million euros (2013)
- Number of employees: 700
- Website: https://www.kasto.com/en/

Kasto Maschinenbau, based in Achern-Gamshurst, Germany, specialises in sawing and storage technology of bar stock. The company manufactures metal-cutting saws, semi-automatic and automatic storage systems as well as automatic handling systems for metal bars, sheet metal and pre-cut parts.

== History ==
In 1844, carpenter Karl Stolzer set up the company as a mechanical workshop in Achern, in the Baden-Württemberg region of Germany. Initially, Stolzer focused on the manufacture of "machines with wooden constructions and iron-plated parts". The company manufactured products such as water wheels, weaving looms and paper and milling machines. With the construction of saw mills and later of saw mill plants, Karl Stolzer set the foundations for his company's success.

With the invention of the hacksaw machine in 1947, Kasto took a vital step towards becoming a modern machine tool manufacturer. In the 1960s, circular saws were added to the product range. With its move into series and volume cutting production, Kasto recognised the need to mechanise bar stock storage and material handling. At the beginning of the 1970s, Kasto introduced the first fully automated bar stock storage system. It featured a portal operating gantry crane for the handling and transport of self-supporting cassettes. This was the precursor of the first combined storage and sawing systems that Kasto manufactured from 1980 onwards.

In 2024 Kasto celebrated its 180th anniversary.

== Corporate structure ==
Kasto produces exclusively in Germany. In addition to its headquarters in Achern and a branch in Schalkau, Thuringia, the company has subsidiaries in England, France, Singapore, Switzerland, China and the United States and an online shop.
