= Leistritz =

German company

Leistritz AG
- Type: Aktiengesellschaft
- Industry: Mechanical and plant engineering
- Founded: 1905
- Headquarters: Nuremberg, Germany
- Key people: Helmut Rothenberger (Chairman of the Supervisory Board), Michael Everts
- Revenue: €425 million
- Number of employees: approx. 1,800
- Website: leistritz.com

Leistritz AG is the parent company of the Leistritz Group and has belonged to the Rothenberger Holding based in Anif near Salzburg since 2016. Leistritz operates in the business sectors of turbine, pump, extrusion, and production technology, and is headquartered in Nuremberg.

== History ==
In 1905, Paul Leistritz founded the Maschinenfabrik Paul Leistritz in Nuremberg. The first major order came from the MAN engine factory, which ordered 30,000 metal blades for steam turbines.

As a new development, screw pumps were added to the production program in 1924, primarily for shipbuilding. In the following year, production was expanded to include the manufacture of silencers for motorcycles, automobiles, and stationary engines. In 1937, screw pumps were further developed for kneading and mixing viscous media. This led to twin-screw extruders for plastics processing, creating the extrusion technology division. From 1940, the company entered the aviation industry and manufactured turbine blades for jet engines.

The Trabitz branch plant was founded in 1941, followed by a plant in Fürth-Stadeln in 1960. In 1965, Leistritz manufactured hydraulic systems for elevator construction at its Bochum plant. In 1973, today's Leistritz Advanced Technologies Corporation was founded in Allendale, New Jersey, USA, to serve the North and South American markets. In 1975, a plant was set up in Pleystein, which initially manufactured silencers for the "VW Beetle". The portfolio expanded over time, and tools, machine tools, tubular components, and whirling machines are still produced at this location today. In 1986, Leistritz Maschinenfabrik GmbH was converted into a stock corporation (Aktiengesellschaft). In the 1990s, sales subsidiaries were established in France and Singapore. Also in the 1990s, the Fürth-Stadeln site was sold to the French automotive supplier Faurecia, which closed the location in 2010 and relocated the production of exhaust technology for the automotive industry to Augsburg.

In 2001, Leistritz AG formed the independent business divisions Leistritz Turbinentechnik GmbH, Leistritz Pumpen GmbH, Leistritz Extrusionstechnik GmbH, and Leistritz Produktionstechnik GmbH.

In 2005, Leistritz AG acquired ThyssenKrupp Turbinenkomponenten GmbH in Remscheid, which now operates under the name Leistritz Turbinentechnik GmbH. In the same year, the location in Belišće, Croatia, was also established.

In 2010, Leistritz Machinery (Taicang) Co., Ltd. was founded in China, accelerating development into a system supplier. In 2011, Leistritz Turbinentechnik GmbH opened a new plant in Chonburi, Thailand (Leistritz (Thailand) Ltd.), which burned down in February 2023 and celebrated a grand reopening in 2024 with the latest laboratory and measurement technology. In 2014/2015, further international sales and service locations were established in Singapore and the United Arab Emirates.

In 2015, Leistritz cooperated with the German UL Thermoplastics Testing Center. This was followed in 2016 by the opening of a new location in Chennai, India (Leistritz India Pte Ltd). Leistritz AG was a member of the Bundeswehr and Business Working Group of the Nuremberg Chamber of Commerce and Industry (IHK Nürnberg) and the Association of Employers' Associations in Bavaria (VAB), Middle Franconia district.

== Corporate structure ==
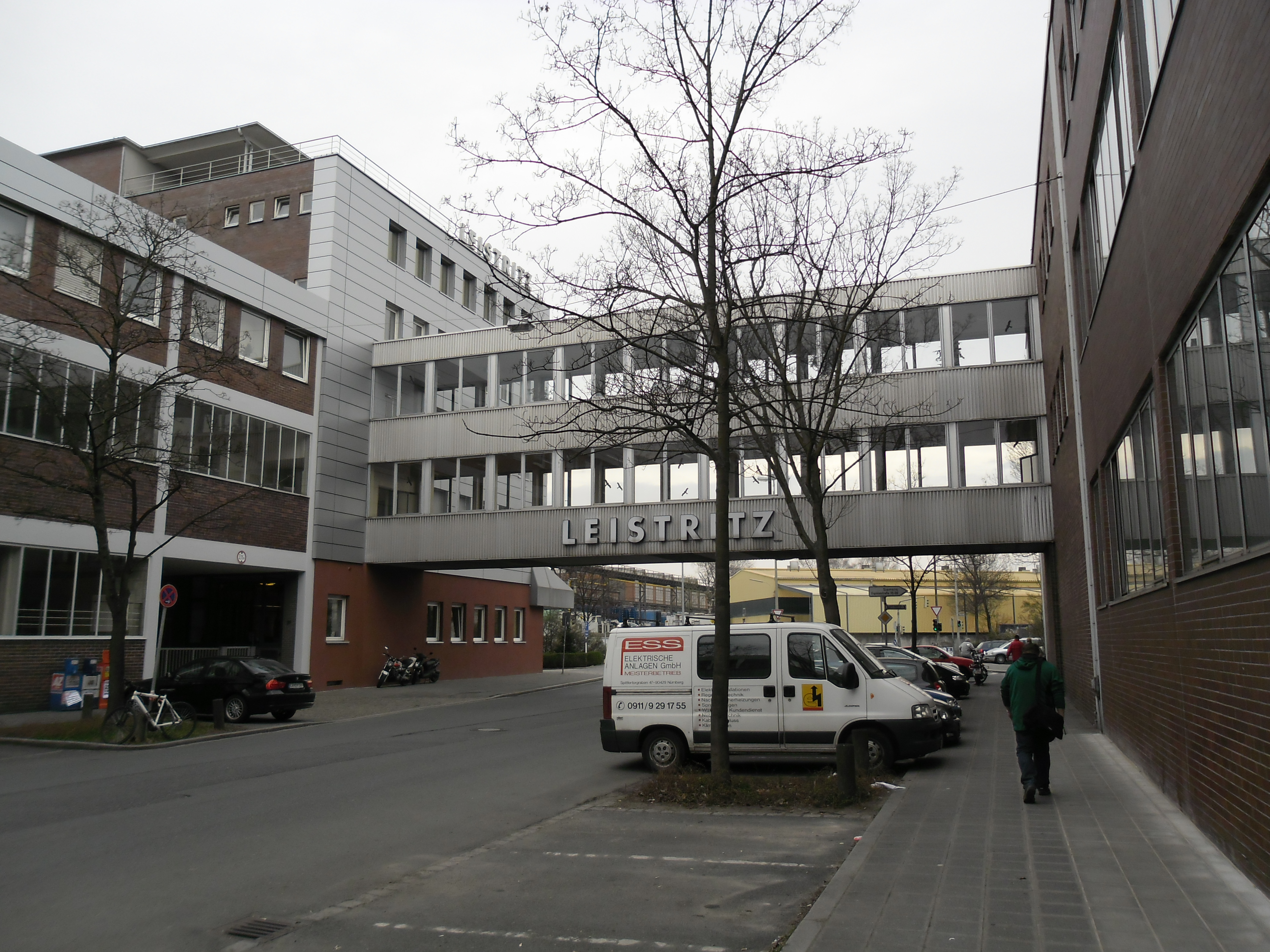
Leistritz plant in Markgrafenstraße, Nuremberg

The group consists of four business divisions that are 100% owned by Leistritz AG and are part of the Rothenberger Group:

- Leistritz Turbinentechnik – Components for aircraft engines
- Leistritz Pumpentechnik – Pumps and systems
- Leistritz Extrusionstechnik – Extruders and extrusion lines
- Leistritz Produktionstechnik – Machine tools, tools, manufacturing technology, tube technology
