= Wolff & Müller =

International construction company

Wolff & Müller is a construction company which operates internationally. The headquarters are at Schwieberdinger Straße, 107 Stuttgart, Germany. The company was founded in 1936 (89 years ago) by master builder Gottlob Müller and engineer Karl Wolff.

Wolff & Müller is one of the top ten German construction companies. Building projects include the Mercedes-Benz Museum and the Porsche Arena in Stuttgart.

Wolff and Müller plans and builds highways, bridges, factories, power plants, office buildings, sports arenas and hotels. The company is involved in the production of asphalt and sand. Wolff and Müller has a division for managing commercial property.
