= Lohmann (company) =

German adhesive company

Lohmann Tape Group
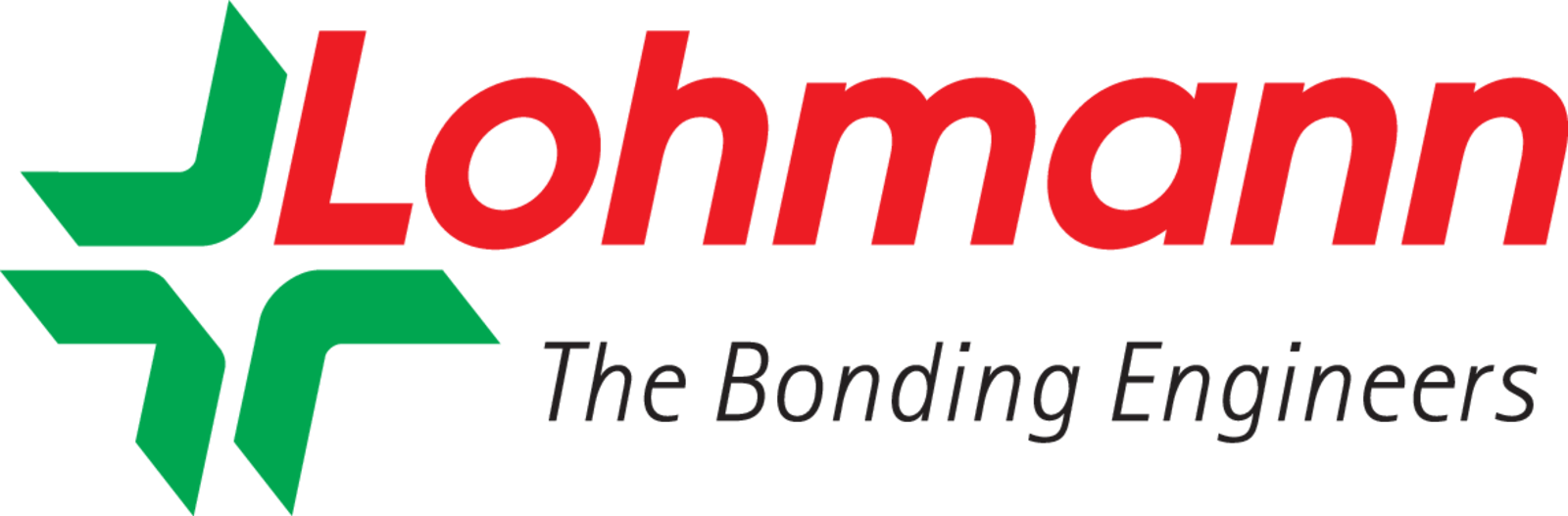

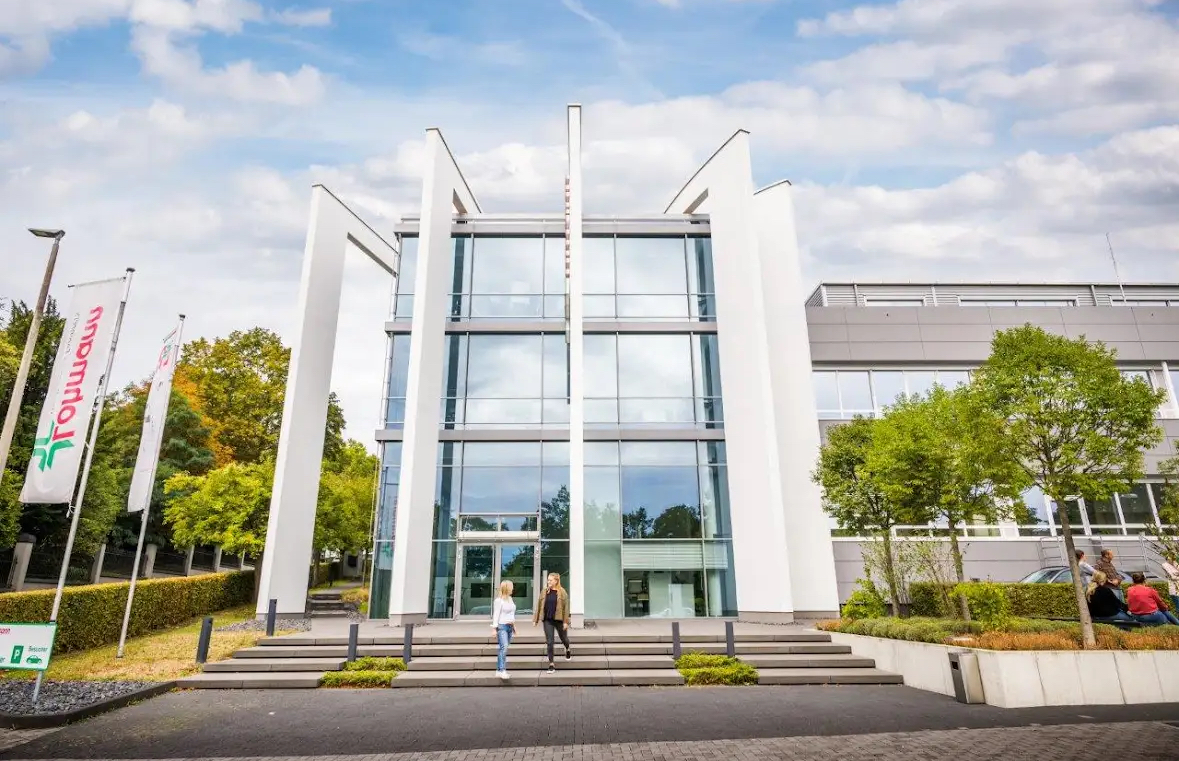
- Lohmann GmbH & Co. KG headquarters in Neuwied, Germany
- Type: Private
- Industry: Technical adhesive products
- Founded: 1851
- Headquarters: Neuwied (Rhineland-Palatinate), Germany
- Key people: Jörg Pohlman (CEO), Martin Schilcher (CFO), Carsten Herzhoff (CTO)
- Number of employees: ca. 1800
- Website: lohmann-tapes.com

Lohmann is a manufacturer of adhesive tape systems and adhesives. Lohmann Tape Group focuses on consumer goods, electronics, transportation, graphics, building and renewables, hygiene and medical industries.

Lohmann Tape Group has 1800 employees worldwide, coating plants at six sites in Europe, Asia and America, 19 subsidiaries and sales partners in over 50 countries. The Company is currently headed by Jörg Pohlman and Carsten Herzhoff.

== Technologies ==
In 1938, Lohmann went into the production of double-sided adhesive tapes, which remains the company’s core business with about 1440 patents for adhesive bonds filed.

In 1951, the company entered the graphics market. The DuploFLEX range included tapes for the printing industry. In 2006, Lohmann-koester developed elastic side panels for diapers (diaper ears).

After about two years of construction, the TEC Center at the Neuwied headquarter was inaugurated in autumn of 2016. It offers 1200 m^{2} of state-of-the-art laboratories, conference rooms as well as the Bonding Arena, an application laboratory. TEC Center hosts the High Performance Coating Line, a modern coating machine. The most recent invention is the “UV-LUX technology”, the world’s first UV-light activatable adhesive tape with color change.

== History ==
The company was founded in Frankfurt am Main by Julius Lüscher in 1851. To import and sell chemicals for use in dyeworks and for the production of medicines. 1870 August Lohmann took over the management. Later the company relocated to Neuwied, Germany. In 1938 Lohmann started the production of double-sided adhesive tapes. Today the Lohmann Tape Group is still headquartered there.

In 1998, Non-woven and Medical became independent legal entities. The latter was incorporated into a joint enterprise with Austrian company Rauscher as Lohmann & Rauscher.

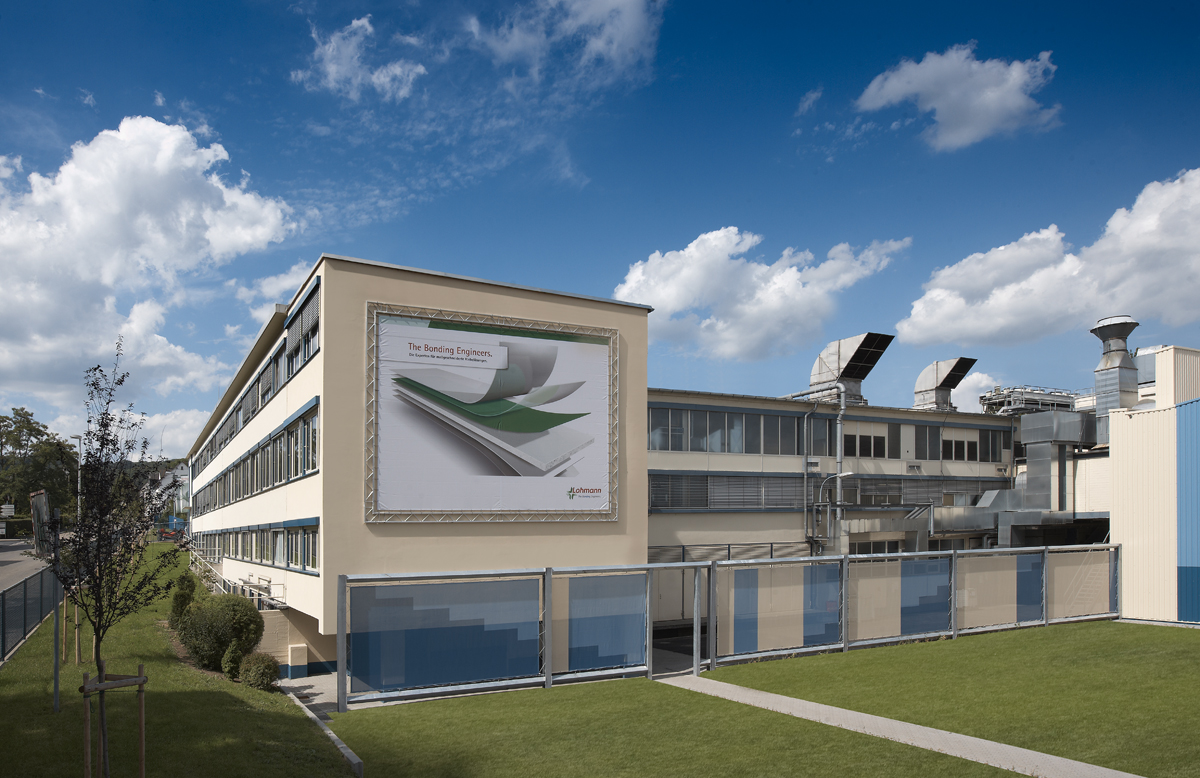
Lohmann Neuwied

=== Expansion ===
In 1991 the company acquired Koester GmbH & Co in Altendorf. Lohmann-Koester manufactures self-adhesive and mechanical closures for diapers and incontinence pads, skin-compatible hotmelt adhesives and adhesive tape for hygiene, medical and technical applications.

In 1992 the company created Lohmann Technologies UK based in Buckinghamshire. It offers adhesives for manufacturers, designers and OEM customers.

In 1998 Lohmann acquired ownership of Metafol GmbH & Co. KG of Remscheid. It conducts adhesive tape processing, adhesive tape converting and die-cutting processes.

Lohmann expanded in America at the start of 2004.

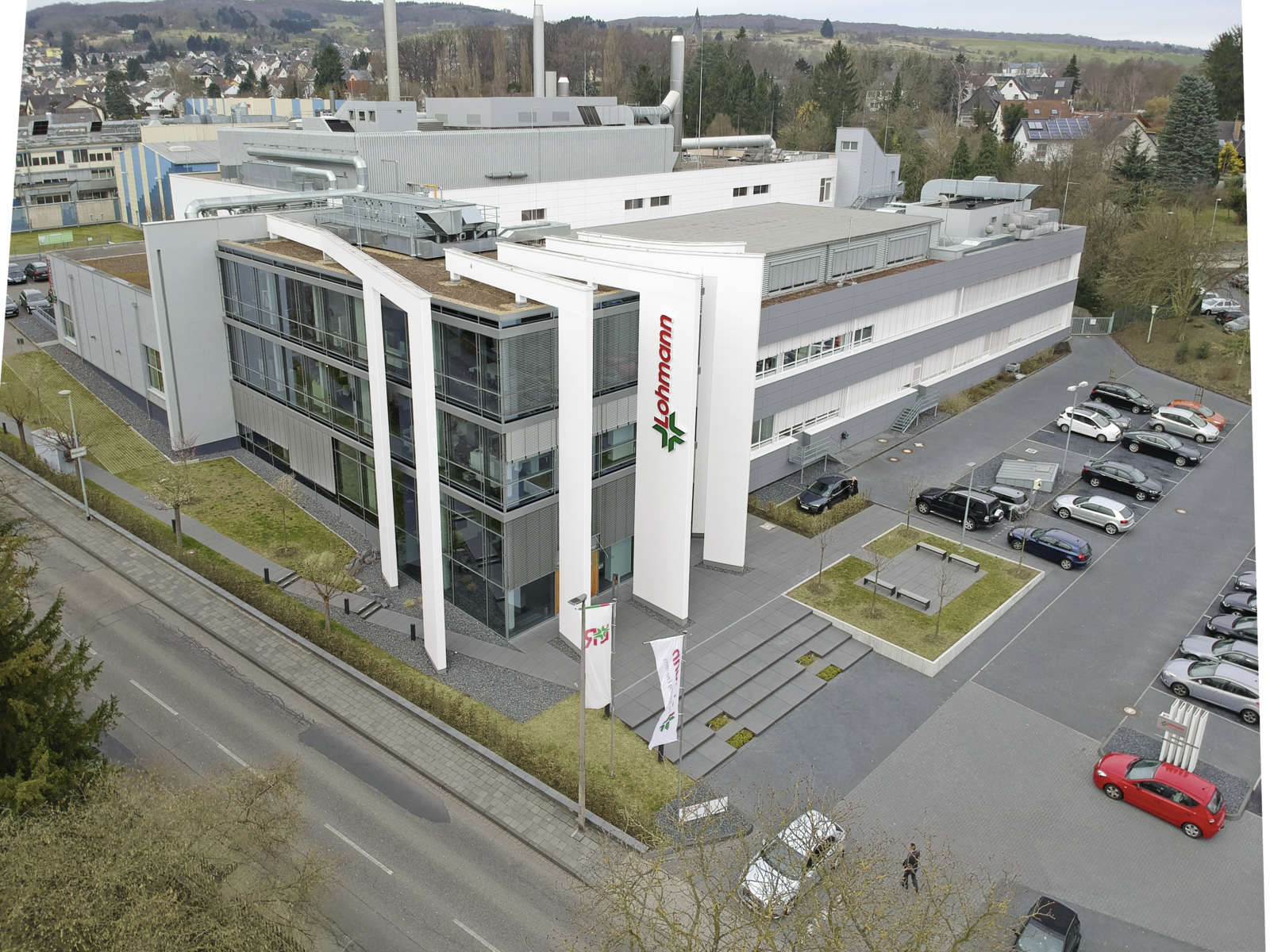
Lohmann's TEC Center was inaugurated in 2016.
