= IGEL Technology =

Multinational software company

- Industry: Computer software
- Founded: 2001
- Headquarters: Bremen, Germany
- Products: Endpoint Management Software, IGEL OS
- Website: igel.com

IGEL Technology (/ˈaɪdʒɛl/ EYE-jel) is a multinational software company best known for IGEL OS, a Linux-based endpoint device operating system.

== History ==
Privately held, the original investor in IGEL was C Melchers GmbH & Co. KG (“Melchers”) which founded the company in 2002 in Bremen, Germany. Originally, IGEL was a manufacturer of hardware "thin clients". Starting in 2019, IGEL has hosted an end user computing and endpoint security forum and expo called DISRUPT, now called Now and Next.

The company permanently exited the hardware business in 2020, and since then, IGEL has been solely a software company. Its headquarters are in Bremen, Germany with North American operations out of Fort Lauderdale.

In 2021, TA Associates ("TA") became the majority investor in IGEL. Melchers continues to maintain an equity interest in the company.

== Partnerships ==
IGEL operates the IGEL Ready program, through which it works with software vendors to assess compatibility and integration with IGEL OS. Participants include Microsoft, CrowdStrike, Palo Alto Networks, Citrix, and Imprivata. IGEL also works with hardware manufacturers, including HP and LG, which offer select endpoint devices with IGEL OS preinstalled or available as a factory configuration.
