= Fulda (tires) =

German tire manufacturer

Fulda Reifen GmbH
- Company type: GmbH
- Industry: Tire manufacturing
- Founded: 1900
- Founders: Gustav Becker, Moritz Hasenclever
- Defunct: September 30, 2025
- Fate: Plant closure; brand continues under Goodyear
- Headquarters: Fulda, Hesse, Germany
- Parent: Goodyear Tire & Rubber Company
- Website: www.fulda.com

Fulda Reifen GmbH was a German tire manufacturer headquartered in Fulda, Hesse. Founded in 1900, it became one of Germany's most recognized tire brands and was later integrated into the Goodyear group. Although the Fulda production plant was closed in 2025, the brand continues to be marketed by Goodyear.

== History ==
Fulda was established in 1900 by engineer Gustav Becker and merchant Moritz Hasenclever as Gummiwerke Fulda GmbH, originally producing technical rubber goods. In 1906, the company manufactured its first solid rubber tires. In January 1909, it was converted into a joint-stock company (Gummi-Werke Fulda AG), with most shareholders from Hasenclever's family.

In 1927, Fulda merged with the Seiberling Rubber Co. of Akron, Ohio, and began producing pneumatic tires with inner tubes. In 1935, it started manufacturing Buna synthetic rubber tires, and its shares were acquired by Vorwerk & Sohn, a company based in Wuppertal.

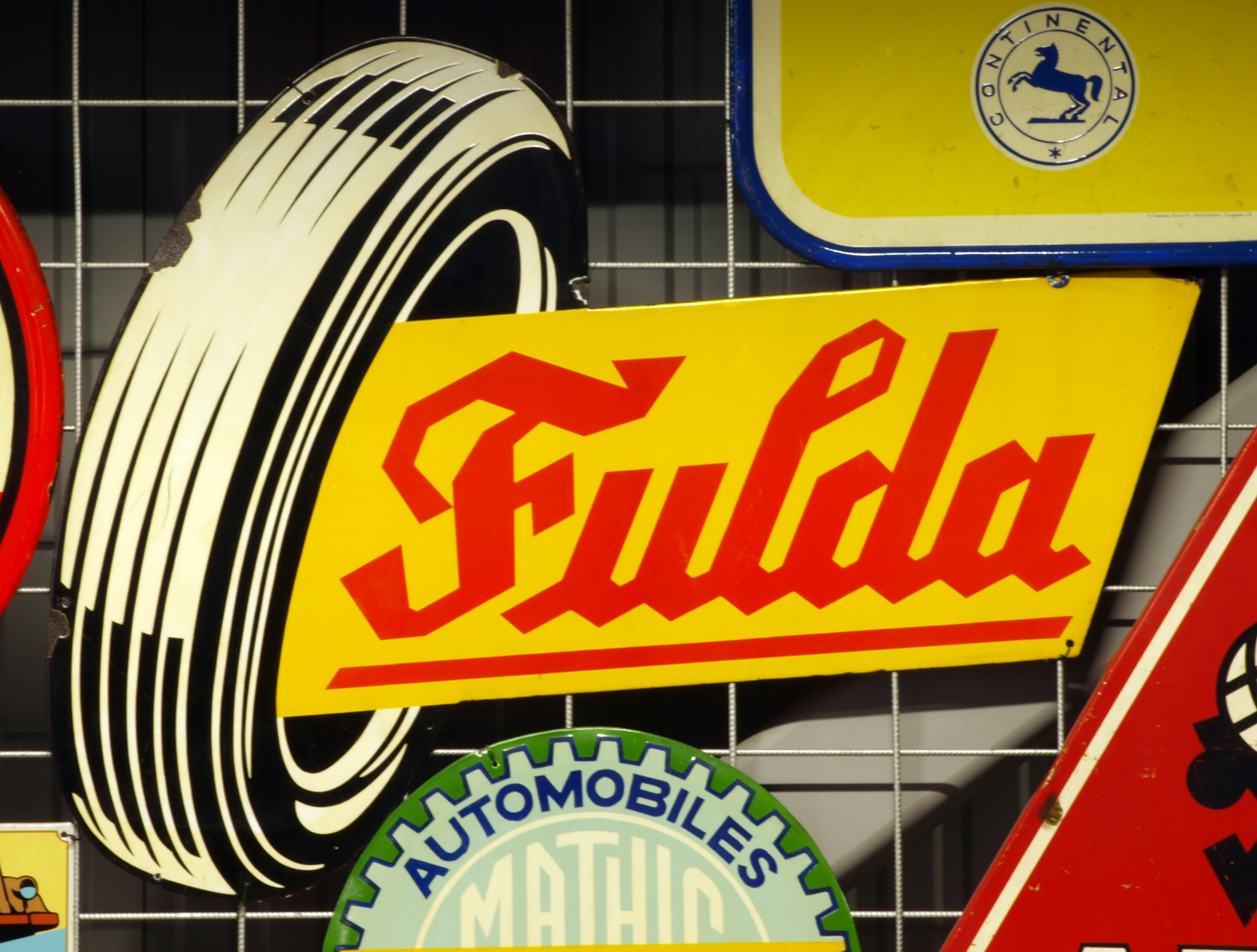
Enamel advertising sign

During World War II, Fulda's production was repurposed for wartime needs. On 11 September 1944, Allied bombing raids completely destroyed the company's facilities. By August 1946, Fulda resumed tire production in temporarily repaired buildings. In 1947, the company employed 630 people, and by early 1949, it had regained full pre-war production capacity.

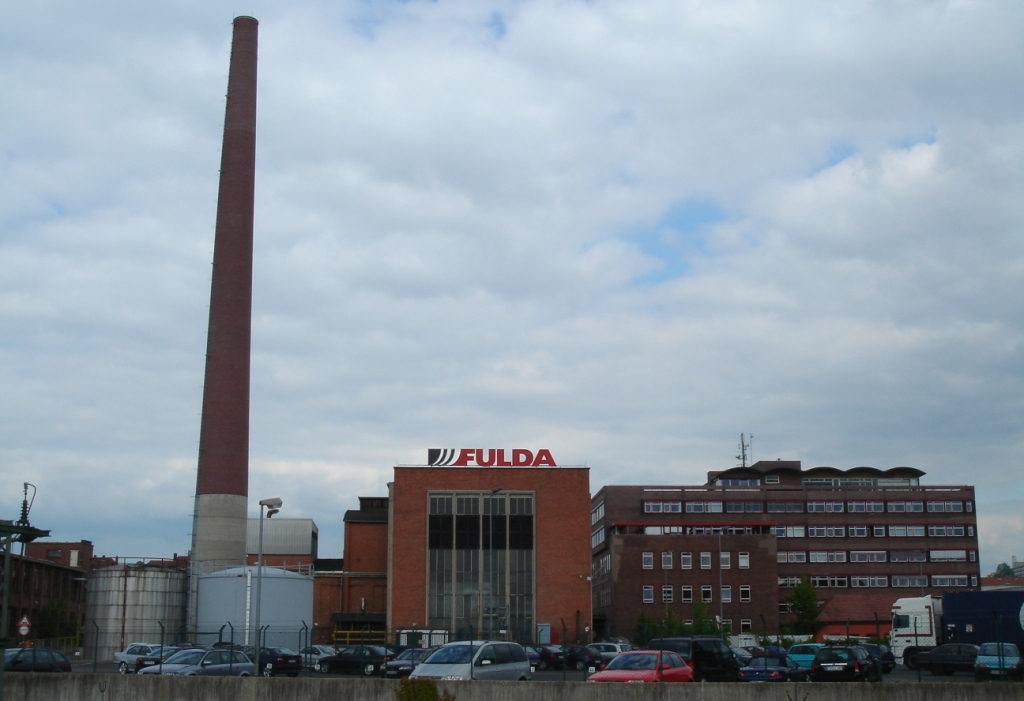
Fulda factory

In 1953, Fulda began producing tubeless car tires. In 1962, it was acquired by the Goodyear Tire & Rubber Company, marking its integration into a global tire network.

== Operations ==
Fulda was one of six Goodyear Dunlop sites in Germany. Tire development was conducted at the Goodyear Innovation Center in Colmar-Berg, Luxembourg. The company focused almost exclusively on the replacement market, supplying tires to specialist dealers. Original equipment business was limited mainly to truck and agricultural tires.

== Closure ==
In November 2023, Goodyear announced that the Fulda plant would close by the end of Q3 2025, affecting approximately 1,050 employees, but the brand continues to be marketed by Goodyear The closure was completed on 30 September 2025, with only a small team remaining for machine dismantling.

== See also ==
- Goodyear Tire & Rubber Company
- Automotive industry in Germany
- Tire manufacturing
