= Grob-Werke =

German company

Grob-Werke GmbH & Co. KG
- Type: Private
- Industry: Engineering, mechanical engineering
- Founded: 1926
- Headquarters: Mindelheim, Germany
- Key people: Christian Grob (Chairman of the Supervisory Board); German Wankmiller (CEO); Wolfram Weber (CFO); Christian Müller (CSO)
- Revenue: €1.37 billion (2022)
- Number of employees: 8,085 (2022)
- Website: www.grobgroup.com/en/

The Grob-Werke GmbH & Co. KG (stylized as GROB-WERKE) is the parent company of the Grob Group. The family-owned business operates in the field of universal machines, assembly lines, system solutions, electromobility, additive manufacturing, automation, and digitalization. Grob-Werke is headquartered in Mindelheim, located in Upper Swabia in the Unterallgäu district.

== History ==
Grob-Werke was founded in 1926 by Ernst Grob in Munich. Initially, the company focused on producing machine tools. From 1935 onwards, it shifted its attention to internal combustion engines, which made the operation "crucial" during World War II. Between 50 and 100 prisoners of war were employed as forced labourers, housed in a separate camp on the company premises at Hofmannstraße 50. In 1944, the factory was extensively destroyed during Allied air raids on Munich, but it was rebuilt in 1945. Grob-Werke is one of the contributors to the Foundation Remembrance, Responsibility and Future, which compensates forced labourers.

Burkhart Grob (* 26 March 1926; † 20 May 2016) led the company from 1952. In 1956, the first overseas plant was established in São Paulo, Brazil.

The main factory was established in Mindelheim in 1968, where production of transfer lines began. By 1976, the Munich facility had been shut down, and the company headquarters were relocated to Mindelheim. In 1971, Burkhart Grob Luft- und Raumfahrt GmbH & Co. KG was founded, and Grob began manufacturing gliders. Grob received its largest order to date in 1998 from the Royal Air Force to deliver a total of 85 G-115 D training sports planes within two years. That same year, Grob also secured a major contract from General Motors and BMV Rover. Grob was awarded contracts worth DM 320 million for the machining and assembly of cylinder heads and engine blocks.

In subsequent years, Grob invested in new facilities and its own branches in Brazil and the United States. In 2003, Grob began establishing service and sales branches in Beijing and Shanghai. Until 2006, Grob-Werke consisted of independent business units of machine tools and aerospace. The aerospace division was sold in 2006 and operated as Grob Aerospace AG afterwards. In 2009, it was renamed Grob Aircraft. Burghardt Grob died in 2016, and Christian Grob took leadership of the group in the third generation as the new chairman of the supervisory board. In 2017, Grob acquired the Italian electromotor machine and equipment manufacturer DMG meccanica in Turin, marking its entry into electromobility.

In 2021, Grob entered into a strategic partnership with Manz AG in the field of lithium-ion battery systems. Due to the shift towards electromobility, there was an increased demand for battery production technology, and the collaboration enabled Grob to offer the entire production process of lithium-ion battery cells and modules. In 2022, Dürr AG joined the partnership.

Grob also initiated an expansion at its headquarters in Mindelheim. With an investment of €19 million, construction of a new hall began, while existing roofs have been increasingly reinforced and equipped with photovoltaic modules since 2023. Grob cites the focus on renewable energies as one of the reasons for these expansions at the headquarters, for which a third energy center based on heat pumps and biomass for sustainable heat supply was also planned in 2023. Internationally, Grob expanded its presence with new locations in Bangalore, India, and Bluffton, Ohio.

== Company structure ==
The Grob-Werke GmbH & Co. KG is the parent company of the Grob Group. In the fiscal year 2022/23, Grob employed 8,085 people and generated a revenue of over €1.37 billion. Nearly half of the turnover is generated by machinery for electric drives and battery storage technologies. The Mindelheim site has been the main plant of Grob-Werke since 1976 and serves as its headquarters. The Mindelheim facility has a production area of more than 199,000 square meters. In addition to the main plant in Mindelheim, the company has production facilities in Bluffton (Ohio), Dalian (China), São Paulo (Brazil), Pianezza (Italy), and Bangalore (India).

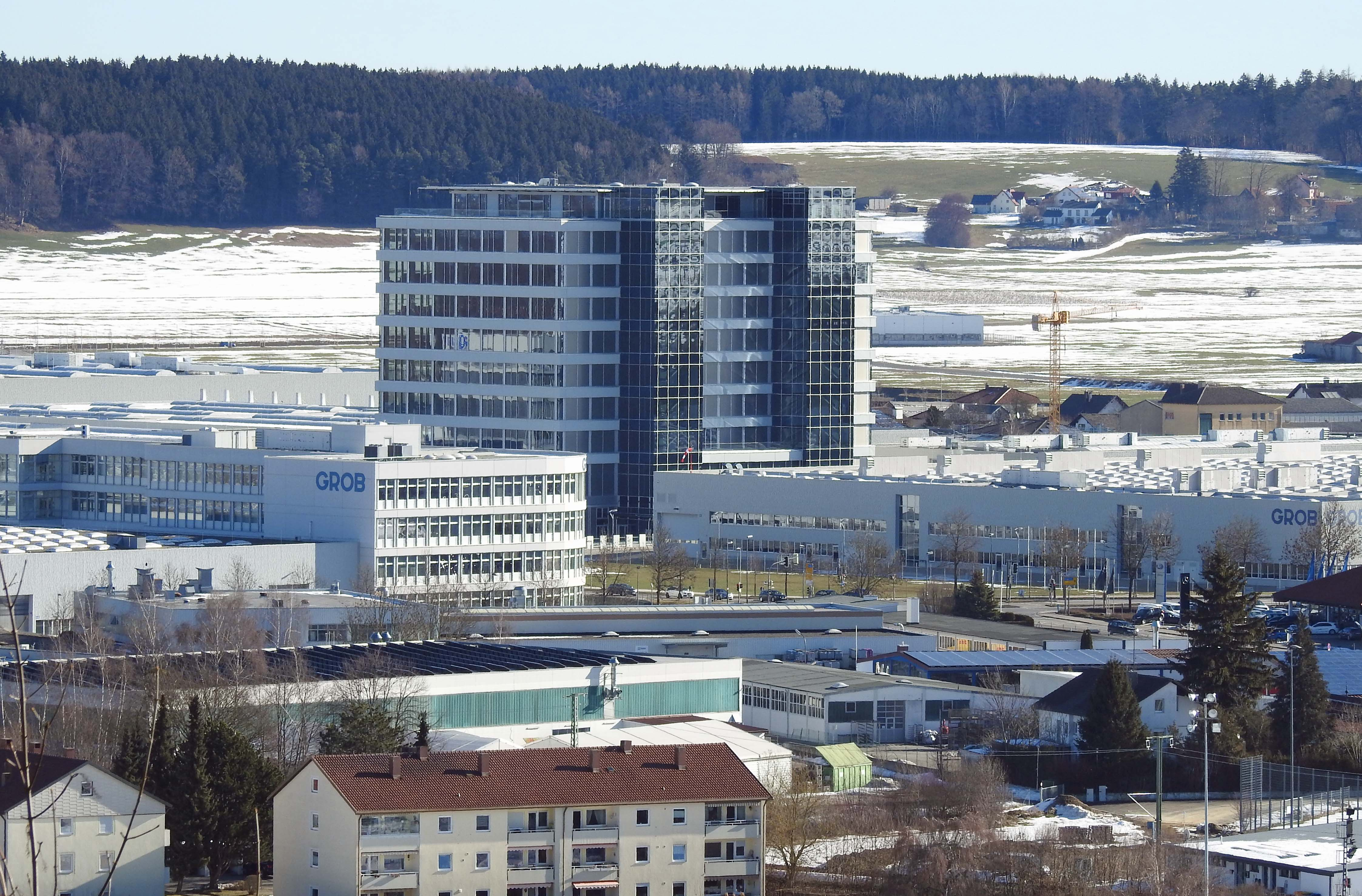
Grob-Werke in Mindelheim (2019)

=== Locations and shareholdings ===
- Grob-Werke GmbH & Co. KG, Mindelheim
- B. Grob do Brasil S.A. (since 1956), São Paulo, Brazil
- Grob Systems, Inc. (since 1983), Bluffton (Ohio), United States
- Grob Machine Tools U.K. Ltd. (since 1990), Birmingham, England
- Grob Mexico S.A. de C.V. (since 2000), Querétaro, Mexico
- Grob Machine Tools (China) Co., Ltd. Beijing Branch (since 2003), Beijing, China
- Grob Korea Co., Ltd. (since 2005), Suwon, South Korea
- Grob Machine Tools (China) Co., Ltd. Shanghai Branch (since 2005), Shanghai, China
- Grob Machine Tools India Pvt. Ltd. (since 2009), Hyderabad, Indien
- Grob Machine Tools (China) Co., Ltd. (since 2011), Dalian, China
- Grob Hungaria Kft. (since 2012), Győr, Hungary
- Grob Italy S.r.l. (since 2015), Pianezza, Italy
- Grob Polska Sp. z o.o. (since 2015), Poznań, Poland
- Grob Systems, Inc. (since 2016), Detroit (Michigan), United States
- Grob Benelux BV (since 2018), SH Hengelo, Netherlands
- Grob Schweiz AG (since 2018), Baar, Switzerland
- Grob France S.A.R.L., Senlis, France
- Grob Vietnam Co., Ltd., Haiphong, Vietnam
- Grob Japan K.K., Yokohama, Japan
- Grob Machine Tools (Thailand) Co., Ltd. (since 2022), Bangkok, Thailand.

== Products ==
Grob-Werke operates in the field of universal machines, assembly lines, system applications, electromobility, additive manufacturing, automation, and digitalization. The group primarily supplies its machine tools to the automotive industry, which is why Grob's products and services are aligned with developments in the automotive sector.

=== Universal machines, assembly systems and automation ===
Grob-Werke designs and manufactures machining centers and assembly facilities, digitalization and automation applications, as well as linking systems for production and assembly lines. Here, Grob is particularly active in the planning and construction of complete manufacturing systems for engines, vehicle transmissions, injection pumps, and similar components. The universal machines are used in various sectors, including the automotive industry, energy and medical technology, aerospace, as well as machinery, tooling, and mould making. The 4- and 5-axis universal machines, for example, can machine or manufacture delicate components. Another mainstay is the construction of special machines for transfer lines. Among the assembly systems distributed by Grob-Werke are systems for stator production using hairpin technology, rotor production, and battery module assembly, which enable fully automated manufacturing for vehicle drives.

=== Machining technology ===
Grob-Werke offers various machining concepts used by the automotive industry. These systems consist of individually modular machining centers as well as custom machines and are customisable. For example, the G520F of the F-Series, introduced in 2023, is designed for the machining of battery housings and lightweight components such as frame structures and chassis parts.

=== Electromobility and industrial electric motors ===
Grob entered into the development of electromobility and adapted the company structure accordingly. This division primarily develops and produces products for battery technology and electric drive trains, including battery pack systems, battery module systems and large-scale systems for battery cell production. Other areas include the complete assembly of electric motors as well as stator and rotor assembly with permanent magnet technology. The company also develops individual processes and systems, for example for processing structural and chassis parts or coating engine components.

The electric mobility sector accounts for over 60% of Grob's business. Customers include European, American, and Asian car manufacturers, with a predominant presence of emerging Chinese manufacturers in the Asian market.

=== Additive manufacturing ===
In the field of additive manufacturing, Grob developed the liquid metal printing (LMP) manufacturing process, which can be used to produce customised near-net-shape aluminium components. This is intended to compensate for the disadvantages of powder-based additive manufacturing, which was often used previously.

=== Digitalization ===
The digitalization area includes software developed by Grob-Werke that digitally links all areas of Grob machine tool production and allows the individual modules to be organised.
