= Schunk SE & Co. KG =

German company

SCHUNK SE & Co. KG
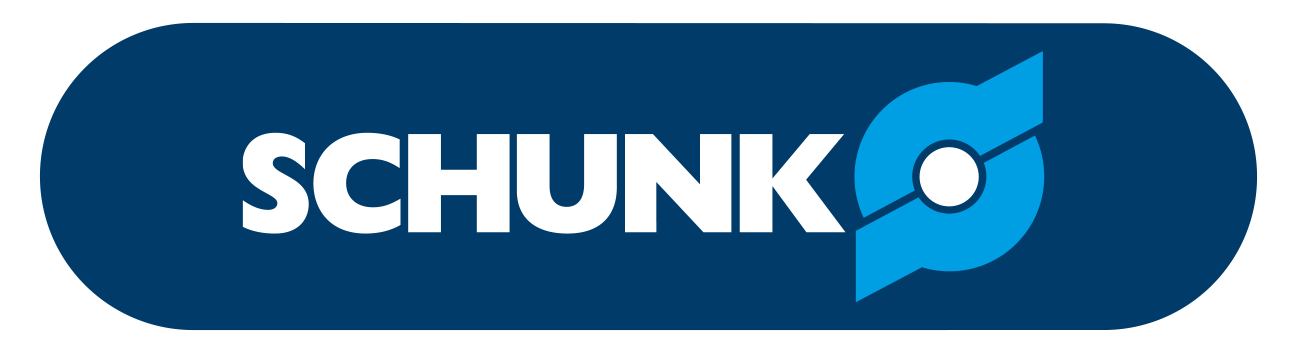
- Type: SE & Co. KG
- Founded: 1945
- Founder: Friedrich Schunk
- Headquarters: Lauffen am Neckar, Germany
- Key people: Heinz-Dieter Schunk; Henrik A. Schunk; Kristina I. Schunk
- Revenue: €515 million (2019)
- Number of employees: 3,500
- Website: schunk.com

SCHUNK SE & Co. KG (stylized as SCHUNK) is a German company specializing in gripping systems and clamping technology, headquartered in Lauffen am Neckar, Germany.

== History ==
The company was founded in 1945 by Friedrich Schunk (1912–1998) in Lauffen am Neckar, shortly after the end of World War II. Early major orders for the mechanical workshop included the production of drum brake components and flywheels for the NSU Prinz 4 as well as parts for the Porsche 356.

Heinz-Dieter Schunk, the founder's son, joined the company in 1964.

In 1989, SCHUNK established its first international subsidiaries—known as “Intecs”—in Belgium and Switzerland. In 1992, the U.S. subsidiary in Raleigh, North Carolina was founded and later expanded into a production site. In 2006, SCHUNK began production in Hangzhou, China, but the plant was closed in 2009 due to quality issues. The Shanghai branch was subsequently developed into a sales location.

Today, SCHUNK operates ten production sites in Lauffen am Neckar, Brackenheim-Hausen, Mengen, St. Georgen im Schwarzwald, Cleebronn, Raleigh–Morrisville (USA), Aadorf (Switzerland), Caravaggio (Italy), El Marqués (Mexico) and Shanghai (China). The company maintains 33 foreign subsidiaries.

The company, with more than 3,500 employees, is currently managed by siblings Henrik A. Schunk and Kristina I. Schunk, representing the third generation of family leadership.

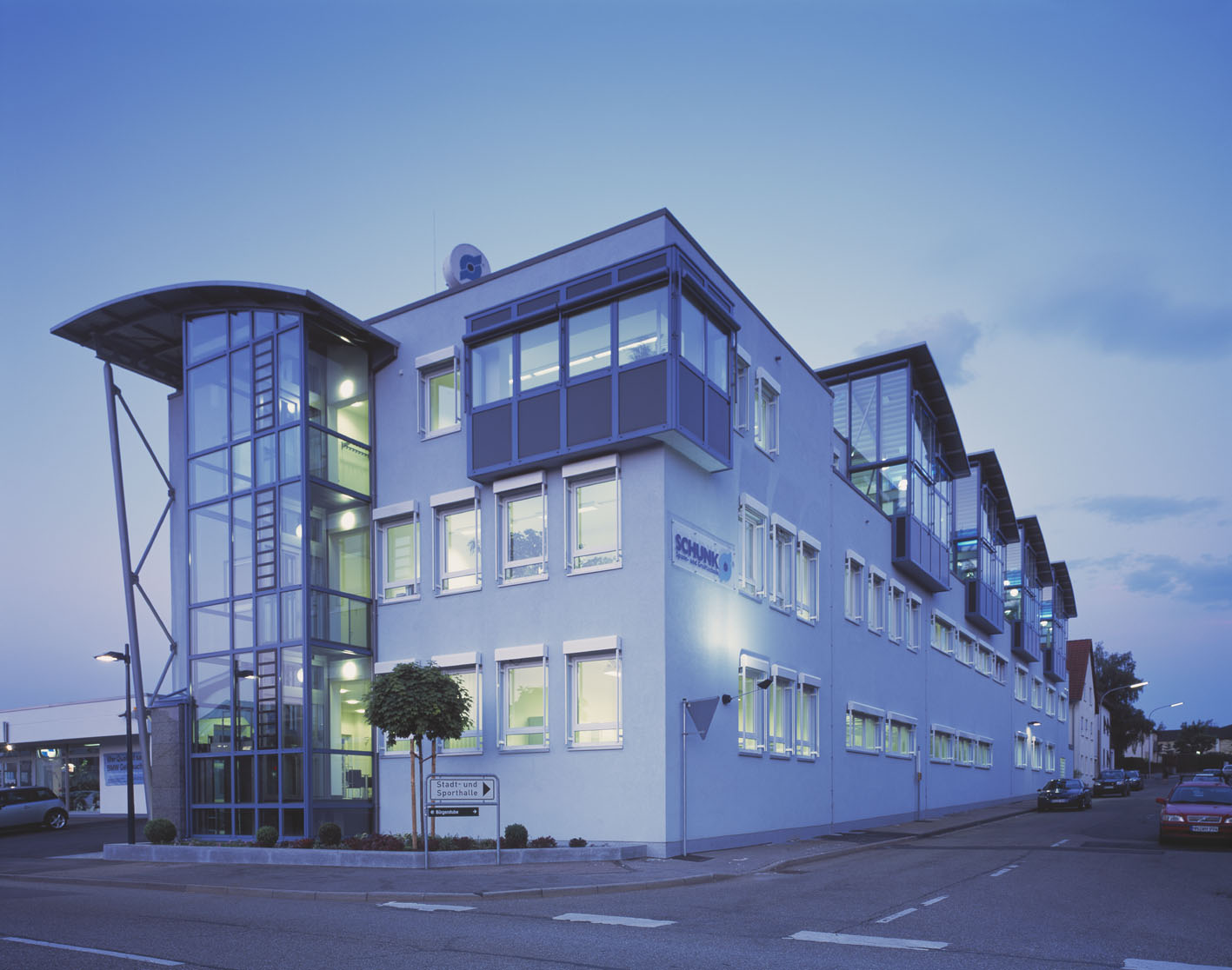
ZEUS development center in Lauffen am Neckar

== Clamping technology ==
Since 1966, SCHUNK has produced standardized chuck jaws for lathe chucks. In 1978, the company added hydraulic expansion toolholding technology as a second product area. With the introduction of the “Tandem” system in 1988, SCHUNK entered the field of stationary workholding systems. In 1994, SCHUNK acquired Hage GmbH in Mengen, expanding into lathe chucks for lathes.

With the acquisition of the Italian company MAG Systems, SCHUNK added magnetic clamping technology to its stationary clamping systems. A stake in the Italian magnetics specialist S.P.D. in 2008 further strengthened this area, and in 2014 S.P.D. S.p.A. was fully integrated into the SCHUNK Group.

In 2010, the Mengen site was expanded for workpiece clamping. In 2014, SCHUNK acquired Gressel AG, a Swiss manufacturer of mechanical clamping systems.

== Gripping systems ==
As industrial robots became established in the early 1980s, SCHUNK introduced its first standardized robotic gripper in 1982, laying the foundation for its automation division. Over the following years, SCHUNK expanded its gripping technology to include rotary modules, linear motion units, and quick-change systems.

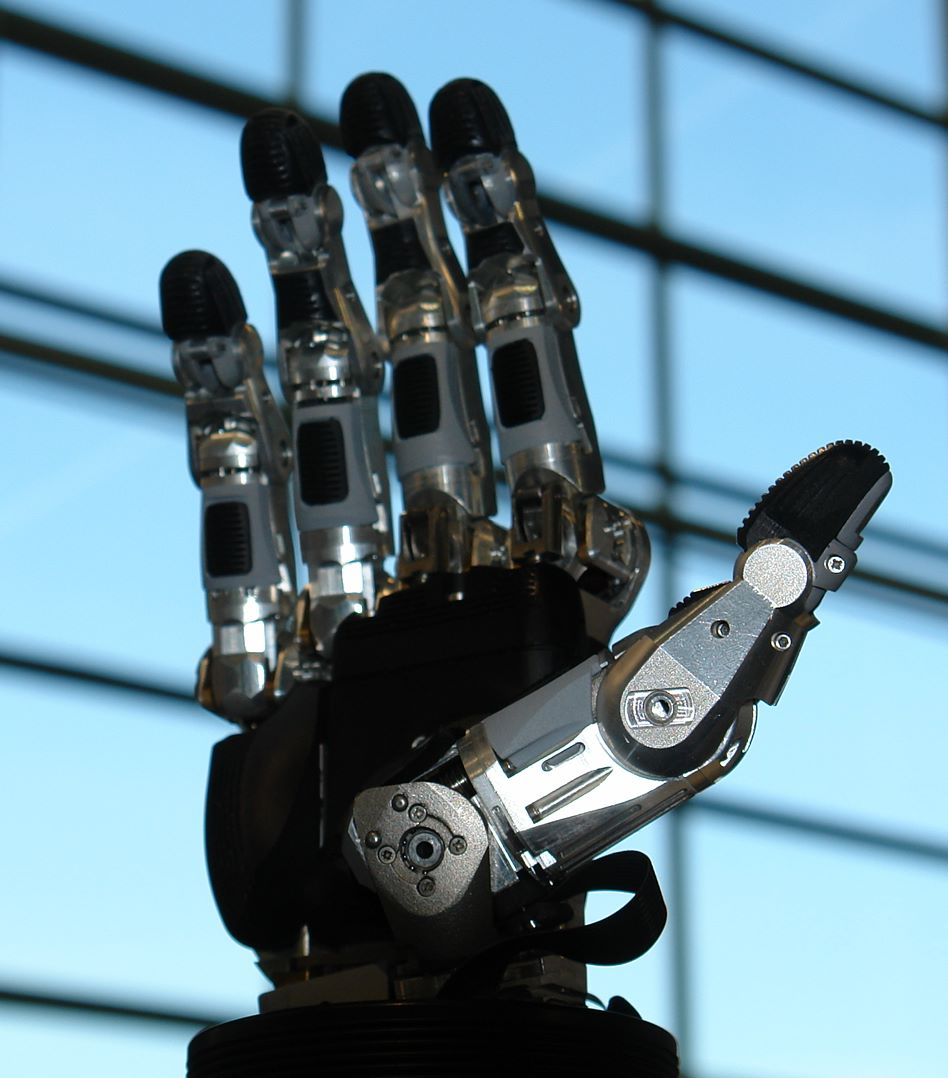
SCHUNK SVH servo-electric five-finger hand

In 2003, the integration of amtec robotics GmbH expanded the automation division with mechatronic drive components and contributed to the development of modular robotics. Through its annual “ExpertDays Service Robotics” symposium, SCHUNK gained a reputation as a leading force in applied service robotics.

In 2006, GEMOTEC Montagetechnik GmbH from Huglfing was integrated into the company, forming the modular assembly technology division. The site was closed in September 2021 due to low capacity utilization and structural changes in the automotive market, exacerbated by the COVID-19 pandemic.

In 2016, SCHUNK presented the Co-act JL1 gripper, a technology demonstrator for human–robot collaboration.
