= Vertical roller mill =

Type of grinder

Vertical roller mill is a type of grinder used to grind materials into extremely fine powder for use in mineral dressing processes, paints, pyrotechnics, cements and ceramics. It is an energy efficient alternative for a ball mill.

== Overview ==
The vertical roller mill is a kind of grinding machine for cement, raw material, cement clinker, slag and coal slag. It has the benefits of simple structure and low cost of manufacture and use. Vertical roller mills have many different forms, but they work basically the same. All of these forms come with a roller (or the equivalent of roller grinding parts), and roller along the track of the disc at the level of circular movement imposed by external grinding roller in the vertical pressure on the disc on the material being the joint action of compression and shear, and to crush.

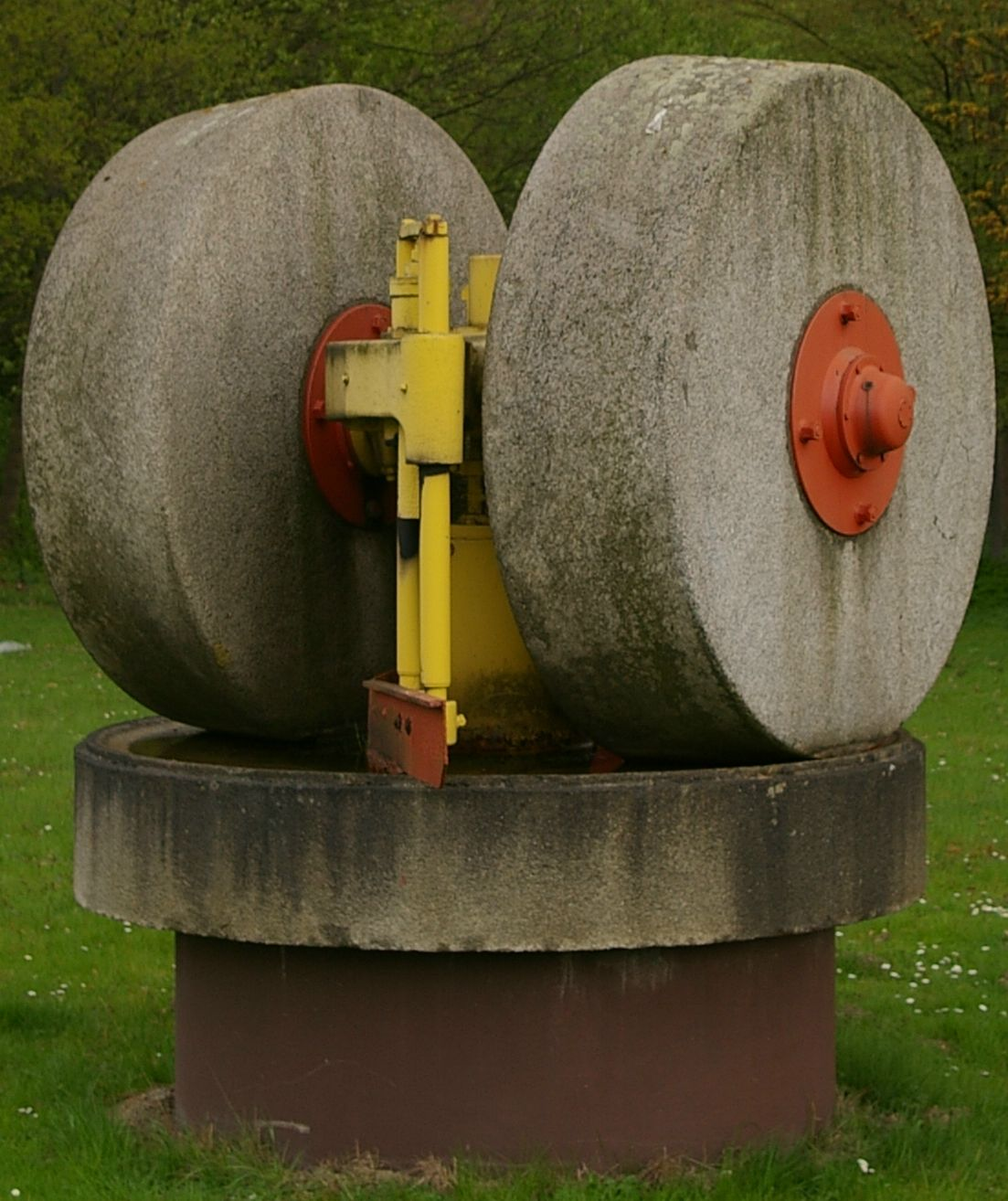
Vertical roller mill.

== Operation ==
Material grinding process motor through reducer rotating drive disc, the material falls from the mill under the central entrance and exit, under the action of centrifugal force to the disc edge by the roller to move and the crushing, grinding out lap after the material was speed up the flow to and vertical mill with one of the separator, after the meal by the separator back to the mill, the re-grinding; powder while grinding out with air, dust collection equipment in the system to collect down, that is, products. Established through the mill in the pneumatic conveying of materials, a larger air flow rate, which can use waste heat of gas, at the same time dry grinding operations.

== Principle ==
Principle of Grinding for these mills are done by Attrition and Compression method. The grinding force are applied through the sets of rollers on to the material bed spread over the rotating grinding table. This causes attrition initially followed by compression from external grinding forces.

Used in cement grinding production grinding parts of its various forms, there is a cylinder, cone type, ball type, etc., and roller surface is also flat, curved, convex round noodles. Applied to the grinding roller to roller grinding along the track bed in close contact with the material strength of a spring pressure, hydraulic, etc.

== Method of operation ==
It has two pairs of grinding rollers, each pair of roller composed of two narrow rollers, mounted on the same axis and can rotate at different speeds. There are two circular disc slot, and roller to the tire shape, work pressure in the tank. Disc roller and the relative sliding velocity between small and roller can swing, even if the roller sleeve and the disc after the liner wear can guarantee a good abrasive, will not affect the grinding effect. Roller symmetrical structure, one side can be upside down after use and wear. Material grinding process: hydraulic pneumatic roller device through the pressure applied to the material on the crushing of materials, the materials have been moved to crush the edge of disc, from the disc around the nozzle from the exhaust air to improve these materials to Separator.Meal to separate returns after a concentrated mill, fine powder was collected in the precipitator unloading. In the gas flow is small, the meal can not be increased to enhance air flow, they would fall through the nozzle discharged outside the mill, bucket elevator to be transported to the feeder of vertical roller mill, and was re-grinding mill feed people. This cycle features of the way there:

1. ring by adjusting the air valve, can change the product fineness can Shide mill bed load material uniformity and stability, improving the grinding efficiency;
2. coarse particles in the external circulation, helps reduce Fan power consumption and overall system power.

== Benefits over ball mill ==
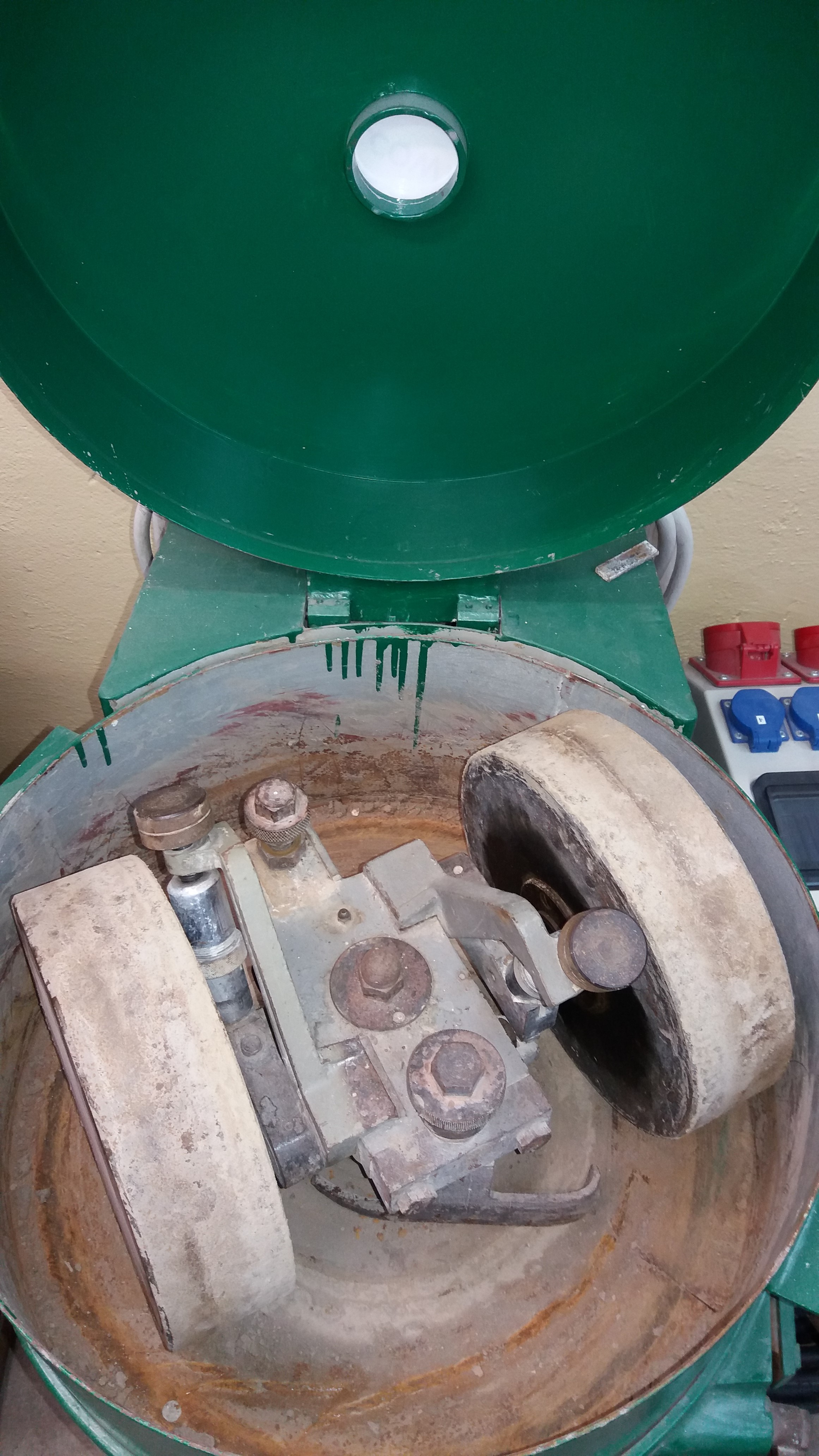
Laboratory vertical roller mill

1. Smaller footprints
2. Can be erected on site which avoid logistical issues.
3. Low wear rate
4. Low operation cost and long service life
5. More grinding capacity (approx. 20–25% more) than ball mill
6. lower power consumption (KWh/Ton) than ball mill + pregrinding

== Limitations ==
1. Complex system
2. Maintenance requirement are higher, In cement grinding, Practically need 2 times annually to re-weld roll and table due to excessive wear
3. Higher overall cost
