= Otto Röhm =

German chemist (1876-1939)

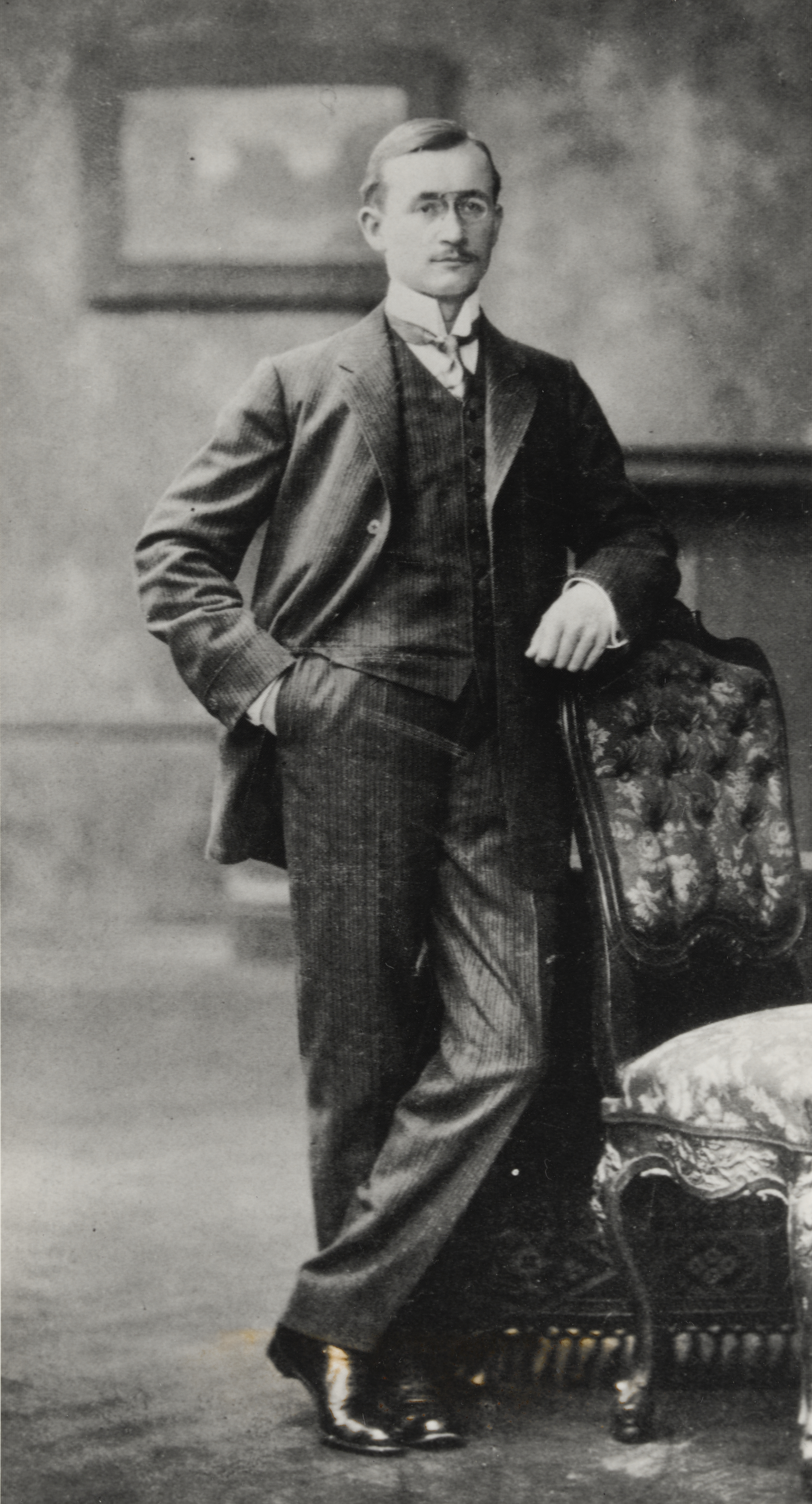
- Rohm in 1908
- Born: 14 March 1876; Öhringen, Germany
- Died: 17 September 1939 (aged 63); Berlin
- Education: Apprenticeship as pharmacy assistant
- Alma mater: universities of Munich

Otto Karl Julius Röhm (German: [ʁøːm]; 14 March 1876, Öhringen, Germany – 17 September 1939, Berlin) was one of the founders and a longtime president of the Röhm und Haas chemical company which became later in the USA the Rohm and Haas (today Dow Chemical) and in Germany the Röhm GmbH (today Evonik Degussa).

== Life ==
After completion of an apprenticeship as pharmacy assistant he started to study pharmacy at the universities of Munich and Tübingen. As a graduated apothecary he completed his studies in 1901 at Tübingen with a dissertation in chemistry on "Polymerisation products of the acrylic acid".

He is named in over 70 patents as inventor or co-inventor. When he died in 1939, his company Röhm GmbH employed 1800 workers and the annual revenues exceeded 22 million Reichsmark. His name is carried by several streets and other public places in Darmstadt, Weiterstadt and Worms.

== Career ==
After the university he started as a researcher at the Merck company, later he worked for the Stuttgart city gasworks. Here Otto Röhm focused on the processing of leather. He discovered an enzymatic leather staining process. This led to a substitute (brand name Oropon) for the fermented dog dung which was formerly used for bating leather (part of the tanning process).

In 1907 he founded the company Röhm & Haas together with the businessman Otto Haas in Esslingen, Germany. Very soon, Otto Haas expanded the business to the USA, in 1909 he founded the first oversea subsidiary in Philadelphia. At the same time in Germany Röhm moved the company to Darmstadt where a larger plant was set up being closer to the leather industry of the Rhein-Main Region.

== Science ==
Otto Röhm was the first chemist who isolated and applied enzymes in technical applications. This led to a revolution in the production and in the use of washing detergents around 1914. In 1920 he introduced enzymes in the pharmaceutical industry and 1934 in the food industry, first application here was the clarifying of fruit juices.

Additionally, the development of polymethyl methacrylate (PMMA) contributed to his economical success. In 1933 he patented and registered the brand PLEXIGLAS (PLEXIGLASS for the international markets).
