= List of largest German companies =

This article lists the largest companies in Germany in terms of their revenue, net profit and total assets, according to the American business magazines Fortune and Forbes, as well as the German newspaper Die Welt.

== 2024 Die Welt list ==
The following list ranks the 100 largest companies in Germany in 2024 based on their 2023 revenue. The data was compiled based on the “Top 500” ranking, which is published annually by the daily newspaper Die Welt.

Rank	Company	Industry	Revenue (billion €)	Employees	Headquarters
1.	Volkswagen AG	Automotive	322.2	614,082	Wolfsburg
2.	Schwarz Beteiligungs GmbH	Grocery retail	167.2	575,000	Neckarsulm
3.	BMW AG	Automotive	155.5	116,324	Munich
4.	Mercedes-Benz Group AG	Automotive	153.2	279,972	Stuttgart
5.	Lidl Stiftung & Co. KG (part of Schwarz Beteiligungs GmbH)	Grocery retail	125.5	360,000	Neckarsulm
6.	Deutsche Telekom AG	Telecommunications	112.0	199,652	Bonn
7.	Uniper SE	Power generation and energy trading	107.9	6,863	Düsseldorf
8.	E.ON SE	Energy	93.686	74,618	Essen
9.	Rewe Group	Retail, tourism	92.310	389,270	Cologne
10.	Robert Bosch GmbH	Conglomerate	91.596	429,416	Stuttgart
11.	Aldi Süd	Retail	83.000	–	Mülheim an der Ruhr
12.	DHL Group	Postal services, logistics	81.758	594,396	Bonn
13.	Siemens AG	Conglomerate	77.769	320,000	Berlin / Munich
14.	Edeka Zentrale AG & Co. KG	Retail	70.700	410,700	Hamburg
15.	Audi AG (part of Volkswagen AG)	Automotive	69.865	87,736	Ingolstadt
16.	BASF SE	Chemicals	68.902	111,991	Ludwigshafen
17.	Daimler Truck	Automotive	55.890	100,000	Stuttgart
18.	Bayer AG	Pharmaceuticals, chemicals	47.637	99,723	Leverkusen
19.	Phoenix Pharmahandel GmbH & Co. KG	Pharmaceutical wholesale	47.065	48,478	Mannheim
20.	Traton SE	Commercial vehicles	46.872	103,621	Munich
21.	ZF Friedrichshafen AG	Automotive supplier	46.627	168,738	Friedrichshafen
22.	BP Europa SE	Petroleum, energy	46.584	9,218	Hamburg
23.	Deutsche Bahn AG	Transport	45.191	292,423	Berlin
24.	EnBW Energie Baden-Württemberg AG	Utilities	44.431	28,630	Karlsruhe
25.	Continental AG	Automotive supplier	41.421	202,763	Hannover
26.	Dr. Ing. h.c. F. Porsche AG (part of Volkswagen AG)	Automotive	40.530	42,140	Stuttgart
27.	ThyssenKrupp AG	Conglomerate	37.536	99,981	Essen
28.	Deutsche Lufthansa AG	Air transport	35.422	96,677	Cologne
29.	Kaufland Stiftung & Co. KG (part of Schwarz Beteiligungs GmbH)	Grocery retail	34.200	148,000	Neckarsulm
30.	SAP	Software	31.207	107,602	Walldorf
31.	Siemens Energy	Energy	31.119	94,000	Munich
32.	Metro AG	Retail	30.551	91,201	Düsseldorf
33.	Shell Deutschland Oil GmbH	Petroleum, natural gas, chemicals	29.500	2,801	Hamburg
34.	Aldi Nord	Retail	29.000	–	Essen
35.	RWE AG	Energy	28.566	20,135	Essen
36.	Hochtief AG	Baudienstleistung	27.756	41,575	Essen
37.	Mercedes-Benz Mobility AG (part of Mercedes-Benz Group AG)	Financial services	26.700	–	Stuttgart
38.	Boehringer Ingelheim Pharma GmbH & Co. KG	Pharmaceuticals	25.611	53,565	Ingelheim am Rhein
39.	Heraeus Holding GmbH	Conglomerate	25.600	16,388	Hanau
40.	Telekom Deutschland GmbH (part of Deutsche Telekom AG)	Telecommunications	25.200	59,709	Bonn
41.	BayWa AG	Retail	23.948	23,144	Munich
42.	VNG AG	Utilities	23.200	1,688	Leipzig
43.	Fresenius SE & Co. KGaA	Pharmaceuticals	22.299	193,865	Bad Homburg
44.	Ceconomy (part of Metro AG)	Retail	22.200	47,530	Ingolstadt
45.	Henkel AG & Co. KGaA	Consumer goods	21.514	47,750	Düsseldorf
46.	Adidas AG	Sporting goods	21.427	59,030	Herzogenaurach
47.	Heidelberg Materials AG	Building materials	21.178	50,997	Heidelberg
48.	Merck KGaA	Chemicals, pharmaceuticals	20.993	62,908	Darmstadt
49.	TUI AG	Tourism	20.665	65,413	Hannover
50.	Würth-Gruppe	Retail	20.396	87,047	Künzelsau
51.	Bertelsmann SE	Medien	20.169	80,418	Gütersloh
52.	Fresenius Medical Care AG & Co. KGaA	Medical technology	19.454	123,120	Bad Homburg
53.	Schenker AG (part of Deutsche Bahn AG)	Transport	19.127	–	Essen
54.	Wintershall Dea AG (part of BASF SE)	Petroleum, natural gas	18.866	–	Celle/Kassel
55.	Hapag-Lloyd AG	Shipping	17.930	16,530	Hamburg
56.	Ford-Werke GmbH	Automotive	17.600	–	Cologne
57.	Penny-Markt GmbH (part of Rewe Group)	Grocery retail	17.171	58,526	Cologne
58.	Netto Marken-Discount AG & Co. KG (part of Edeka Zentrale AG & Co. KG)	Retail	17.100	87,300	Maxhütte-Haidhof
59.	Aurubis AG	Copper producer	17.064	7,230	Hamburg
60.	Brenntag AG	Chemical distribution	16.815	17,700	Essen
61.	Schaeffler AG	Metalworking industry	16.313	83,362	Herzogenaurach
62.	Infineon Technologies AG	Semiconductors	16.309	58,590	Neubiberg
63.	dm-drogerie markt GmbH & Co. KG	Retail	15.900	79,745	Karlsruhe
64.	Adam Opel AG	Automotive	15.851	–	Rüsselsheim
65.	Knauf Gruppe	Building materials, building systems	15.600	42,500	Iphofen
66.	Evonik Industries AG	Specialty chemicals	15.267	33,409	Essen
67.	Lekkerland AG & Co. KG	Conglomerate	15.100	5,700	Frechen
68.	Otto (GmbH & Co KG)	E-commerce	14.995	38,456	Hamburg
69.	BSH Hausgeräte GmbH (part of Robert Bosch GmbH)	Electrical engineering, home appliances	14.800	60,000	Munich
70.	MAN Truck & Bus SE (part of Traton)	Commercial vehicle manufacturing	14.800	36,000	Munich
71.	TotalEnergies Holding Deutschland GmbH	Petroleum, energy	14.700	1,800	Berlin
72.	Marquard & Bahls AG	Petroleum/energy	14.484	–	Hamburg
73.	Covestro AG	Advanced materials, chemicals	14.377	14,100	Leverkusen
74.	Lufthansa Air Plus Servicekarten GmbH (part of Lufthansa AG)	Financial services	14.200	–	Neu-Isenburg
75.	Mahle GmbH	Automotive supplier	12.818	72,373	Stuttgart
76.	Droege International Group AG	Industrial holding company	12.400	10,000	Düsseldorf
77.	Remondis SE & Co. KG	Water and recycling management	12.100	43,000	Lünen
78.	Maxingvest GmbH & Co. KGaA	Holding company	12.044	–	Hamburg
79.	Edeka Minden eG	Retail	12.001	25,685	Minden
80.	Freudenberg Sealing Technologies	Industry	11.903	52,241	Weinheim
81.	Dirk Rossmann GmbH	Drugstores	11.796	62,100	Burgwedel
82.	KION GROUP AG	Mechanical engineering	11.434	42,325	Wiesbaden
83.	Exxon Mobil Central Europe Holding GmbH	Petroleum	11.037	–	Hamburg
84.	Stadtwerke Köln GmbH	Utilities	11.022	–	Cologne
85.	Airbus Operations GmbH	Civil aviation	10.796	–	Hamburg
86.	Salzgitter AG	Steel production	10.790	25,183	Salzgitter
87.	Südzucker AG	Food	10.289	20,114	Mannheim
88.	Zalando SE	E-commerce	10.143	15,793	Berlin
89.	Carl Zeiss AG	Optics	10.108	42,992	Oberkochen
90.	Alliance Healthcare Deutschland GmbH	Pharmaceutical wholesale	10.029	–	Frankfurt
91.	EWE AG	Utilities	10.005	10,845	Oldenburg
92.	Delivery Hero SE	Delivery service	9.942	44,612	Berlin
93.	Globus Holding GmbH & Co. KG	Retail	9.820	44,790	St. Wendel
94.	DB Regio AG (part of Deutsche Bahn AG)	Transport, public local transport	9.706	–	Frankfurt
95.	Thüga Holding GmbH & Co. KGaA	Utilities	9.703	–	Munich
96.	Stadtwerke München GmbH	Utilities	9.672	–	Munich
97.	MHK Group AG	Home and living	9.661	616	Dreieich
98.	Esso Deutschland GmbH	Energy	9.558	–	Munich
99.	Jet Tankstellen Deutschland GmbH	Petroleum	9.541	–	Hamburg
100.	Noweda eG	Pharmaceutical wholesale	9.472	3,399	Essen

== 2024 Fortune list ==
This list displays all 29 German companies in the Fortune Global 500, which ranks the world's largest companies by annual revenue. The figures below are given in millions of US dollars and are for the fiscal year 2023. Also listed are the headquarters location, net profit, number of employees worldwide and industry sector of each company.

Rank	Fortune 500 rank	Name	Industry	Revenue (USD millions)	Profits (USD millions)	Employees	Headquarters
1	11	Volkswagen	Automotive	348,409	17,945	684,025	Wolfsburg
2	41	BMW	Automotive	168,103	12,205	154,950	Munich
3	42	Mercedes-Benz Group	Automotive	165,638	15,417	166,056	Stuttgart
4	77	Deutsche Telekom	Telecommunications	121,046	19,239	199,652	Bonn
5	79	Uniper	Electric utility	116,663	6,819	6,863	Düsseldorf
6	82	Allianz	Insurance	113,518	9,233	157,883	Munich
7	101	E.ON	Electric utility	101,280	559	72,242	Essen
8	105	Robert Bosch GmbH	Automotive parts	99,021	2,271	429,416	Stuttgart
9	103	DHL Group	Transportation	88,386	3,975	551,233	Bonn
10	145	Siemens	Conglomerate	82,932	8,477	320,000	Munich / Berlin
11	172	BASF	Chemicals	74,487	243	111,991	Ludwigshafen
12	205	Deutsche Bank	Banking	65,978	6,645	90,130	Frankfurt
13	215	Munich Re	Insurance	63,353	4,979	42,812	Munich
14	227	Daimler Truck	Automotive	60,420	4,081	102,946	Leinfelden-Echterdingen
15	257	Edeka Zentrale	Retail	54,455	462	410,700	Hamburg
16	274	Deutsche Bahn	Transportation	53,198	−2,566	326,781	Berlin
17	286	Bayer	Pharmaceuticals	51,498	−3,179	99,723	Leverkusen
18	290	Phoenix Pharmahandel	Retail	50,935	234	41,276	Mannheim
19	295	ZF Friedrichshafen	Automotive parts	50,407	−34	165,938	Friedrichshafen
20	312	Landesbank Baden-Württemberg	Banking	48,567	1,080	10,434	Stuttgart
21	316	EnBW	Electric utility	48,032	1,662	26,943	Karlsruhe
22	327	Talanx	Insurance	46,156	1,709	27,863	Hanover
23	344	Continental AG	Automotive parts	44,778	1,250	202,763	Hanover
24	374	Lufthansa	Airline	40,455	1,807	79,759	Cologne
25	377	ThyssenKrupp	Conglomerate	40,028	−2,210	99,981	Essen
26	404	DZ Bank	Banking	37,221	2,303	29,901	Bad Homburg
27	450	SAP SE	Technology	34,542	6,637	107,602	Walldorf
28	478	Siemens Energy	Energy technology	33,184	−4,833	94,000	Munich
29	494	Metro AG	Retail	32,579	468	81,834	Düsseldorf

== 2024 Forbes list ==
This list is based on the Forbes Global 2000, which ranks the world's 2,000 largest publicly traded companies. The Forbes list takes into account a multitude of factors, including the revenue, net profit, total assets and market value of each company; each factor is given a weighted rank in terms of importance when considering the overall ranking. The table below also lists the headquarters location and industry sector of each company. The figures are in billions of US dollars and are for the year 2024. All 49 companies in the Forbes 2000 from Germany are listed.

Rank	Forbes 2000 rank	Name	Headquarters	Revenue (billions US$)	Profit (billions US$)	Assets (billions US$)	Value (billions US$)	Industry
1	31	Allianz	Munich	148.2	9.7	1,056.8	113.8	Insurance
2	43	Volkswagen	Wolfsburg	348.6	16.3	672.0	65.6	Automotive
3	52	Mercedes-Benz	Stuttgart	164.3	14.4	288.5	77.1	Automotive
4	61	BMW	Munich	168.3	11.6	274.7	65.8	Automotive
5	62	Deutsche Telekom	Bonn	121.5	4.8	318.8	119.1	Telecommunications
6	68	Siemens	Munich / Berlin	84.4	8.0	156.3	148.2	Conglomerate
7	96	Munich Re	Munich	70.0	5.0	298.9	65.1	Insurance
8	146	Deutsche Bank	Frankfurt	68.0	4.9	1,437.3	33.6	Banking
9	202	Deutsche Post	Bonn	87.9	3.8	74.2	51.3	Transportation
10	230	SAP SE	Walldorf	34.5	2.1	78.8	244.7	Technology
11	238	Daimler Truck	Leinfelden-Echterdingen	60.7	4.2	79.5	34.4	Automotive
12	279	E.ON	Essen	89.8	1.3	123.1	36.1	Electric utility
13	310	Merck Group	Darmstadt	22.6	3.0	53.5	79.1	Pharmaceuticals
14	311	Commerzbank	Frankfurt	25.7	2.6	596.1	19.9	Banking
15	318	Talanx	Hanover	54.0	1.9	179.7	20.1	Insurance
16	337	RWE	Essen	28.0	1.9	111.5	28.1	Electric utility
17	448	Infineon Technologies	Munich	16.9	2.8	31.4	52.2	Technology
18	500	Henkel	Düsseldorf	23.3	1.4	35.0	38.3	Consumer goods
19	535	HeidelbergCement	Heidelberg	22.9	2.1	40.2	19.0	Building material
20	550	BASF	Ludwigshafen	72.1	0.0	88.3	47.5	Chemicals
21	558	Deutsche Börse	Frankfurt	6.6	1.9	262.9	37.2	Finance
22	583	Bayer	Leverkusen	51.9	−3.4	129.5	30.5	Pharmaceuticals
23	665	Lufthansa	Cologne	38.8	1.5	51.1	8.7	Airline
24	681	Continental AG	Hanover	44.3	0.8	40.8	13.6	Automotive parts
25	714	EnBW	Karlsruhe	41.9	0.0	7.6	19.7	Electric utilities
26	723	Porsche SE	Stuttgart	5.7	5.5	68.9	16.5	Automotive
27	744	Siemens Energy	Munich	34.6	−2.4	54.2	21.5	Energy
28	829	Fresenius	Bad Homburg	29.6	−0.7	47.8	17.1	Healthcare
29	829	Adidas	Herzogenaurach	23.4	0.1	19.9	44.5	Apparel
30	1031	Beiersdorf	Hamburg	10.2	0.9	14.1	35.2	Consumer goods
31	1077	Vonovia	Bochum	5.3	−4.3	101.6	26.3	Real estate
32	1177	ThyssenKrupp	Essen	38.7	−2.5	33.3	3.4	Conglomerate
33	1225	Brenntag	Essen	17.7	0.7	11.5	10.9	Chemicals
34	1328	Rheinmetall	Düsseldorf	8.0	0.6	12.5	24.2	Aerospace and defense
35	1331	Evonik Industries	Essen	16.3	−0.4	22.1	10.2	Chemicals
36	1343	TUI AG	Hanover	23.5	0.6	17.5	3.6	Hospitality
37	1498	Knorr-Bremse	Munich	8.7	0.7	9.5	13.0	Technology
38	1502	Schaeffler Group	Herzogenaurach	17.6	0.5	18.7	4.6	Automotive parts
39	1595	Covestro	Leverkusen	15.3	−0.2	14.8	9.9	Chemicals
40	1671	BayWa	Munich	24.8	−0.1	14.3	0.9	Retail
41	1690	Wüstenrot & Württembergische	Stuttgart	5.8	0.3	73.8	1.3	Finances
42	1695	Ceconomy	Düsseldorf	24.2	0.1	10.8	1.5	Retail
43	1708	KION Group	Frankfurt	12.5	0.4	20.6	6.4	Technology
44	1790	Südzucker	Mannheim	11.1	0.6	11.4	3.1	Food processing
45	1813	Deutsche Pfandbriefbank	Unterschleißheim	3,1	0.1	56.2	0.8	Banking
46	1831	Diebold Nixdorf	Hudson, Ohio	3.8	1.5	3.9	3.6	Financial services
47	1856	Aurubis	Hamburg	17.9	0.1	8,3	3.7	Mining
48	1873	Aareal Bank	Wiesbaden	3.1	0.0	51.7	2.2	Banking
49	1986	Delivery Hero	Berlin	10.7	−2.5	11.9	9.8	Food delivery

== See also ==
- List of the largest trading partners of Germany
