= Aleksinsky =

Aleksinsky (masculine), Aleksinskaya (feminine), or Aleksinskoye (neuter) may refer to:

- Aleksinsky District, a district of Tula Oblast, Russia
- Aleksinsky (rural locality) (Aleksinskaya, Aleksinskoye), several rural localities in Russia
