= Scout24 =

German online real estate marketplace

Scout24 SE
- Type: Public
- Traded as: FWB: G24; MDAX component
- ISIN: DE000A12DM80
- Industry: Online marketplace
- Founded: 16 August 1998; 28 years ago in Munich, Germany
- Number of employees: 1100 (2023)
- Website: www.scout24.com

Scout24 SE is a German publicly listed digital company headquartered in Munich, operating the online marketplace ImmoScout24. The ImmoScout24 multi-platform attracted over 20 million visitors monthly in Germany in 2021, either through the website or the app.

The company's shares have been listed in the DAX since 22 September 2025.

ImmoScout24 serves as an online portal for real estate providers, owners, tenants, and buyers, attracting approximately 20 million visitors monthly to its website and app. As of the end of 2019, it hosted 425,000 real estate listings.

The Berlin-based company has a workforce of around 1100 employees.

== History ==
Scout24 was established in 1998 by internet entrepreneur Joachim Schoss, financed by entrepreneur Otto Beisheim and others. In 2004, T-Online, then a subsidiary of Deutsche Telekom, acquired Scout24 from Beisheim Holding. Following the merger of T-Online International with Deutsche Telekom, Scout24 became a direct subsidiary of Deutsche Telekom in June 2006.

In 2011, Telekom sold Scout24 Group's job exchange, JobScout24, to CareerBuilder.

In 2012 ImmoScout24 launched in Austria.

By mid-2013, Deutsche Telekom announced its intention to sell the Scout24 group. On 21 November 2013 Telekom disclosed that it had divested 70 percent of its shares in Scout24 to Hellman & Friedman for EUR 1.5 billion.

On 7 September 2015 Scout24 announced its IPO on the Frankfurt Stock Exchange. Approximately 29.5 million shares were to be placed with an offer volume of EUR 899 million. Following the IPO, Hellman & Friedman would retain 49% ownership, while Deutsche Telekom would hold 14% of the shares. The remaining shares were to be in free float. Trading on the Frankfurt Stock Exchange commenced on 1 October 2015. In September 2016, Hellman & Friedman divested its entire stake in Scout24. In June 2018, the Scout24 share was included in the MDAX of the German Stock Exchange. In July 2018, the portal Finanzcheck.de was acquired.

On 15 February 2019 the Scout Group accepted a takeover bid of around 5.7 billion euros from Pulver BidCo GmbH, backed by financial investors Blackstone Group and Hellmann & Friedmann. However, the takeover failed when, as of 14 May 2019, only 42.8% of shareholders approved the takeover bid, falling short of the minimum 50% approval threshold. Despite this, financial investor Blackrock still retains a stake in Scout24.

In December 2019, it was announced that Hellmann & Friedman would acquire the marketplaces AutoScout24, FinanceScout24, and Finanzcheck from Scout24 for EUR 2.9 billion in the first half of 2020.

In May 2025 Scout24 announced its acquisition of IMMOunited.

In September 2025 the Scout24 share was included in the DAX.

The Austrian Federal Competition Authority then began an in depth review owing to competition concerns. Scout24 withdrew their proposed merger with IMMOunited on 02 December 2025. IMMOunited subsequently launched a property portal in direct competition to Scout24 in June 2026.

== Conflicts with other domain owners ==
Scout24 International Management AG, headquartered in Switzerland, issued warnings to numerous domain owners containing "Scout" in their names, asserting that the term "Scout" alone, without "24," was protected by trademark law. However, "Scout" is not registered as a trademark, and by the end of 2012, the World Intellectual Property Organization (WIPO) had rejected an application by Scout24 International Management AG against owners of similar domains.
