= Heidelberg Materials =

German building materials manufacturer

- Type: Aktiengesellschaft
- Traded as: FWB: HEI; DAX component
- Industry: Building materials
- Predecessor: HC Zementwerk Hannover
- Founded: 1874
- Founder: Johann Philipp Schifferdecker
- Headquarters: Heidelberg, Germany
- Key people: Dominik von Achten (CEO and chairman of the managing board); Bernd Scheifele (Chairman of the supervisory board)
- Products: Cement, aggregates, concrete, asphalt
- Revenue: ▼€21,156 million (2024)
- Operating income: ▼€2,780 million (2024)
- Net income: ▼€1,746 million (2024)
- Total assets: ▲€38,255 million (2024)
- Total equity: ▲€19,975 million (2024)
- Number of employees: ▼51,000 (2023)
- Website: https://www.heidelbergmaterials.com/en

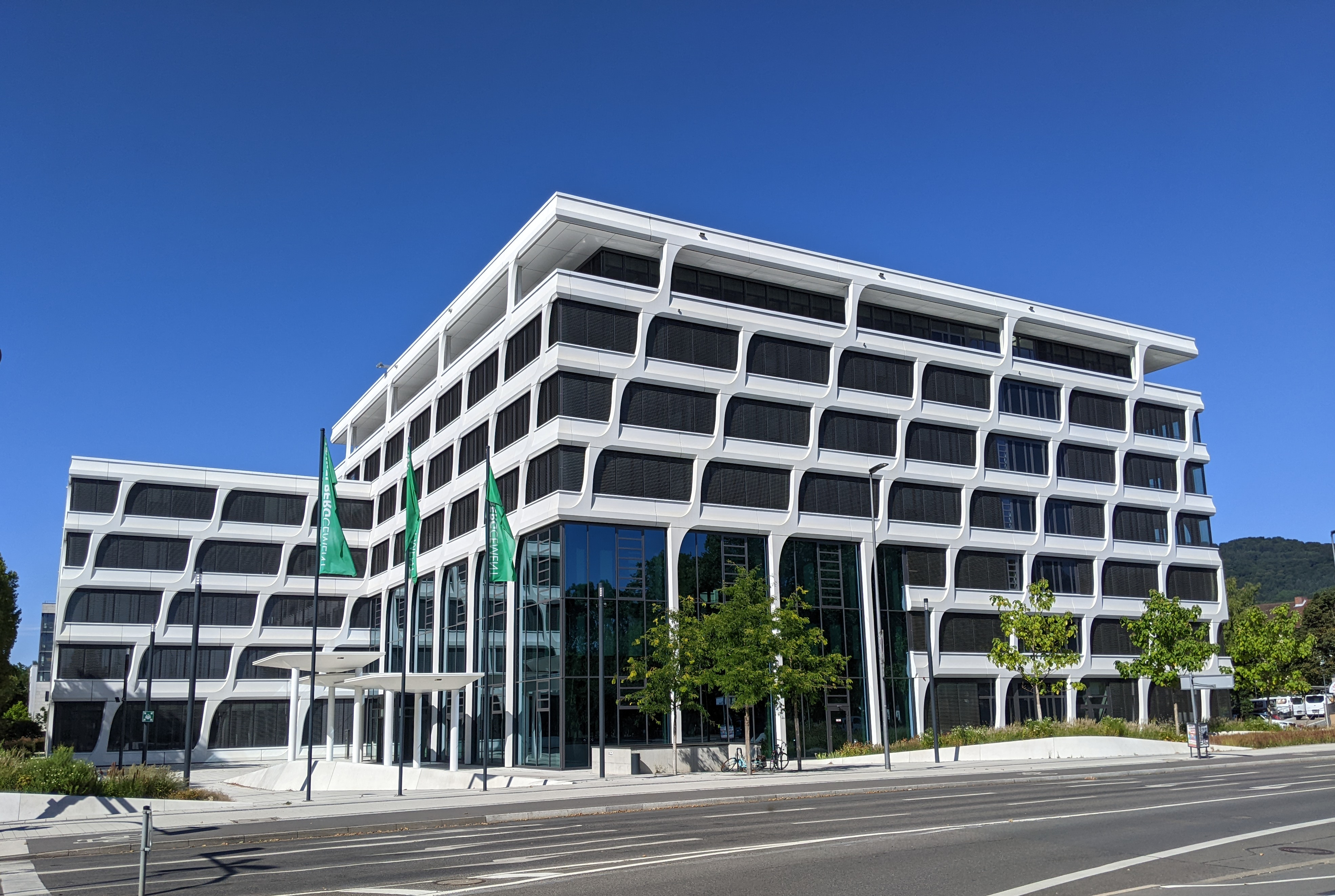
Heidelberg Materials in Heidelberg

Heidelberg Materials is a German multinational building materials company headquartered in Heidelberg, Germany. Formerly known as HeidelbergCement AG, the company has rebranded as Heidelberg Materials in September 2022. It is a DAX corporation and stands as one of the world's largest building materials companies. On 1 July 2016, HeidelbergCement AG completed the acquisition of a 45% shareholding in Italcementi. This acquisition made HeidelbergCement the number one producer of construction aggregates, the second-largest in cement and the third-largest in ready-mixed concrete worldwide. In the 2020 Forbes Global 2000, HeidelbergCement was ranked as the 678th -largest public company in the world.

The enlarged group has activities in over 50 countries with 51,000 employees working at almost 3,000 production sites. Heidelberg Materials operates around 130 cement plants with an annual cement capacity of around 170 million tonnes, around 1,300 ready-mixed concrete production sites, and just under 600 aggregates quarries.

== History ==
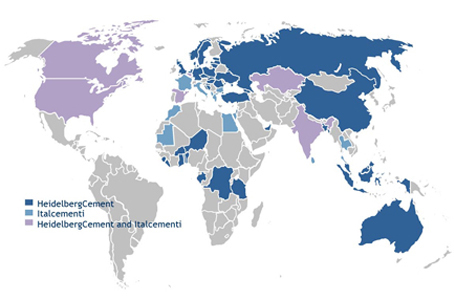
HeidelbergCement incl. Italcementi

The company was founded on 5 June 1874 by Johann Philipp Schifferdecker, at Heidelberg, Baden-Württemberg, Germany. It was making 80,000 tonnes per annum of Portland cement in 1896. It acquired numerous other small companies from 1914 onwards, and by 1936, it was making one million tonnes per annum.

Following the Nazi seizure of power in 1933, the cement industry profited massively from state-run construction and armaments projects, leading to a generally positive view of the policies of the Reich government among workers and management of the company. The company's general director Otto Heuer had joined the NSDAP on 1 May 1933, and was a member of the Freundeskreis Reichsführer SS. During the Second World War, the cement industry was classified as essential to the war effort and initially experienced only minor restrictions in production. As the war progressed, prisoners of war and forced labourers were used in numerous plants; according to the company, the number of people affected is estimated at 1,000.

Activities abroad began with the acquisition of part of Vicat Cement, France. Shipments reached 8.3 million tonnes in 1972. In 1977, a massive program of purchases in North America began with the acquisition of Lehigh Cement. In 1990, expansion in eastern Europe began.

In 1993, it acquired part of SA Cimenteries CBR of Belgium, which already had a major multinational operation. Since then, it has continued to expand, with complete buy out of CBR, and purchases in eastern Europe and Asia. A major step was the acquisition of Scancem in 1999, with operations in Northern Europe as well as Africa. Indocement in Indonesia was included in 2001.

In May 2007, HeidelbergCement announced its intent to purchase the British company Hanson plc for £11 per share, which valued it at approximately £8 billion. This deal made the combined company the second largest cement and building materials company in the world. The transaction was completed through Heidelberg subsidiary Lehigh UK on 22 August 2007.

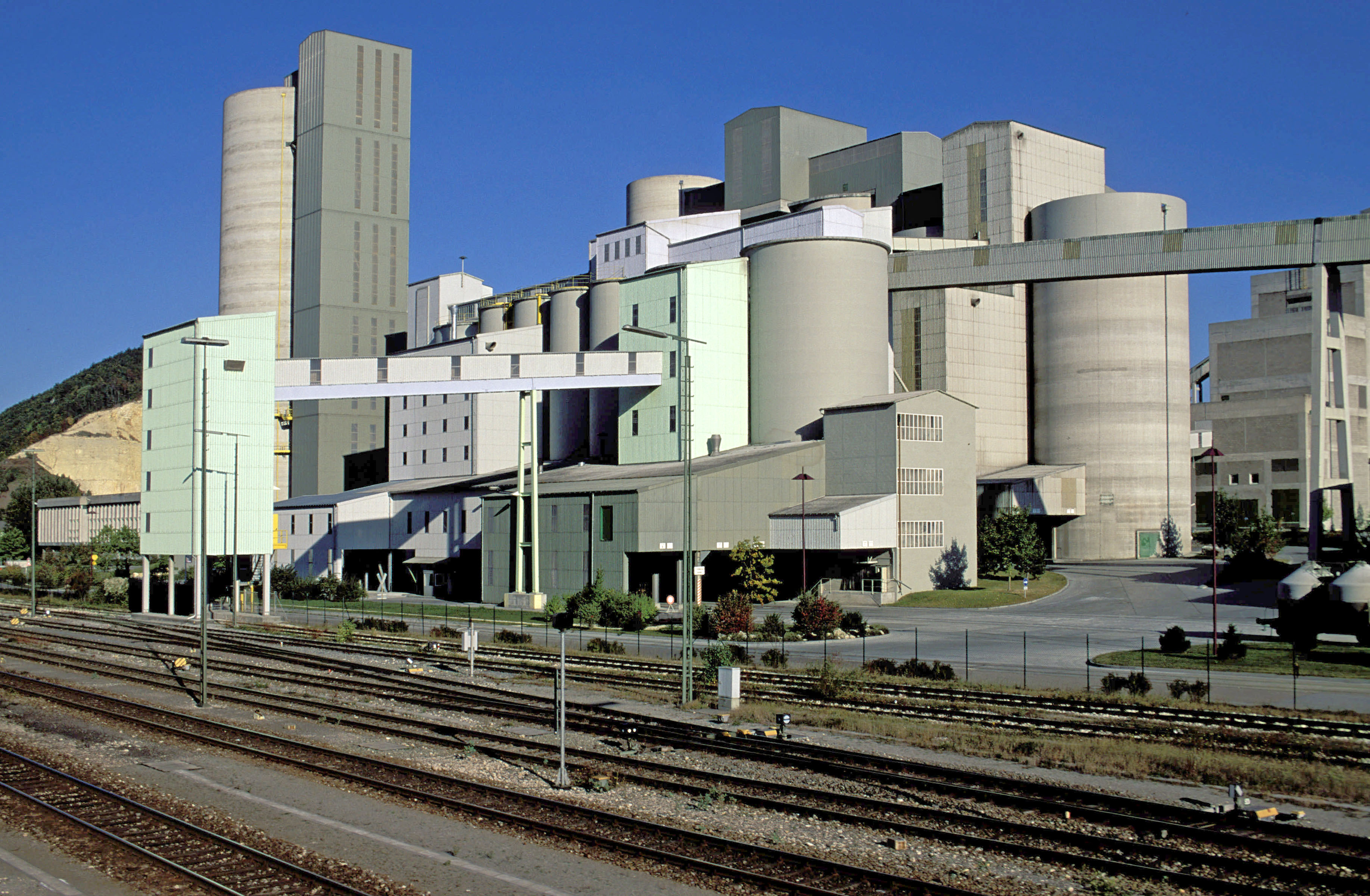
HeidelbergCement plant in Schelklingen, Germany

HeidelbergCement has (2010) 29 cement and grinding plants in Western and Northern Europe, 19 in Eastern Europe and Central Asia, 16 cement plants in North America, and 14 in Africa and the Mediterranean Basin. The company sold Maxit Group and its 35% share in Vicat Cement to help finance its acquisition of Hanson plc in August 2007. In most of the group's European countries, HeidelbergCement is the market leader in the cement business.

Adolf Merckle was a big investor in HeidelbergCement. A capital increase in HeidelbergCement in September 2009, combined with a selling of shares from the Merckle family, opened up for other international owners and higher trading volumes on the stock exchanges. In August 2006, HeidelbergCement AG entered the Indian cement market with the acquisition of Mysore Cement.

In 2013, the cement company CJSC Construction Materials based in the Russian Republic of Bashkortostan was acquired.

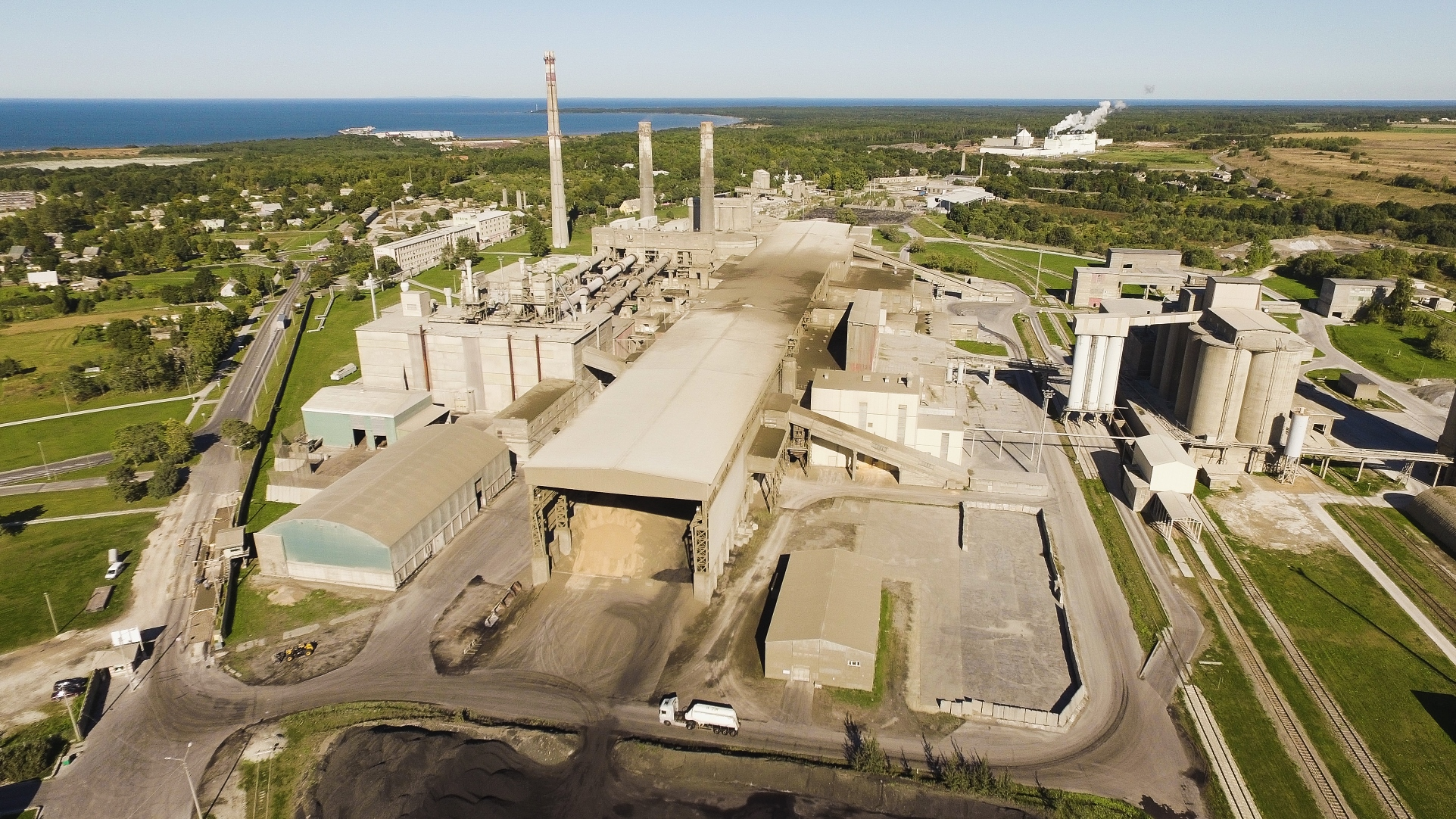
Kunda Nordic Tsement in Estonia is one of the subsidiaries of HeidelbergCement.

On 1 July 2016, HeidelbergCement AG completed the acquisition of a 45% shareholding in Italcementi S.p.A. With the acquisition, HeidelbergCement became the number one producer of aggregates, the number two in cement and number three in ready mixed concrete worldwide. The company agreed to sell its assets in the United States for $660 million to Cementos Argos to fulfil anti-trust requirements for the takeover.

The Heidelberg headquarters on Berliner Strasse, built in 1963, were demolished in 2017 and a larger new building was built on the same site by 2020 for around 100 million euros.

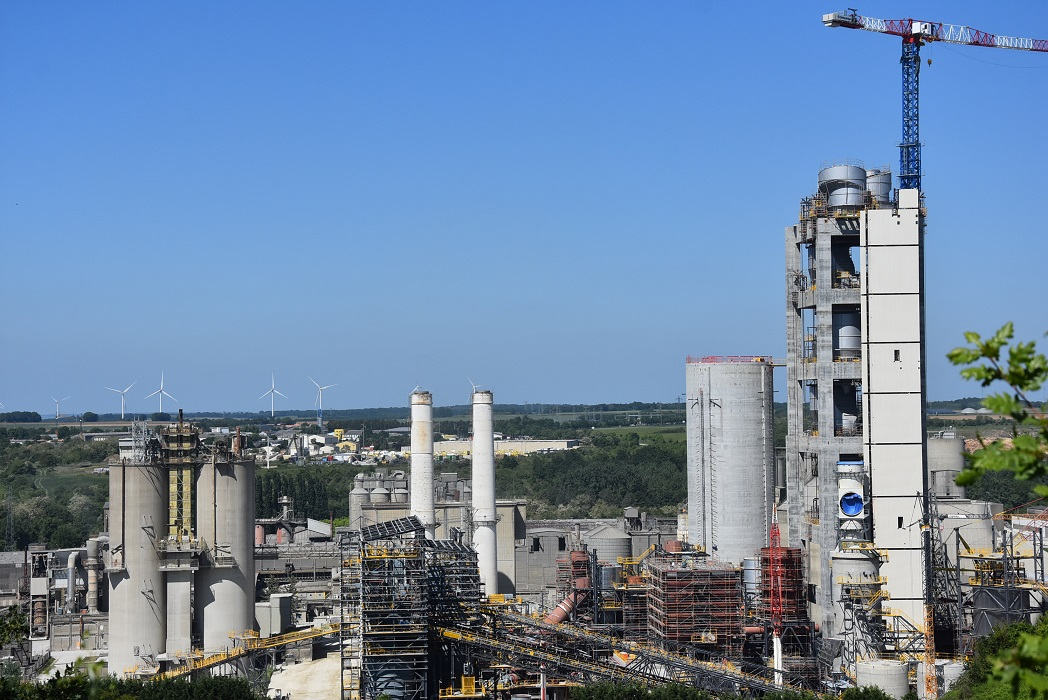
Plant under construction in western France, spring 2025.

Heidelberg has entered new important markets, including France and Italy in Europe, Egypt and Morocco in North Africa and Thailand in Southeast Asia. In Canada, India and Kazakhstan, the takeover further strengthens the existing market presence of HeidelbergCement. The enlarged group is active in around sixty countries, with 60,000 employees working at 3,000 production sites. Heidelberg Materials operates around 130 cement plants with an annual cement capacity of around 170 million tonnes, around 1,300 ready-mixed concrete production sites, and just under 600 aggregates quarries.

On 21 December 2023, the Kakanj cement factory announced the decision to change its name to Heidelberg Materials Cement BiH dd Kakanj.

== The company worldwide ==
Heidelberg Materials Global Corporate Headquarters are located in Heidelberg, Germany.

The company operates in over 50 countries/territories around the world including:

- Australia
- Bangladesh
- Belgium
- Bosnia and Herzegovina
- Brunei
- Bulgaria
- Canada
- China
- Croatia
- Czech Republic
- Democratic Republic of the Congo
- Denmark
- Egypt
- Estonia
- France
- Germany
- Ghana
- Greece
- Hungary
- Iceland
- India
- Indonesia
- Italy
- Kazakhstan
- Latvia
- Lithuania
- Luxembourg
- Malaysia
- Mauritania
- Morocco
- Netherlands
- Norway
- Israel
- Poland
- Romania
- Russia
- Singapore
- Spain
- Sri Lanka
- Sweden
- Tanzania
- Thailand
- Togo
- Turkey
- United Kingdom
- United States

=== United States ===
In 1986, British Hanson Cement, which was acquired by Heidelberg Cement in 2007, bought the Leigh Cement factory and quarry in Santa Clara County, California. After 80 years of operation and more than 2,000 local, state and federal violations, including around 100 considered to be serious, from 2012 to 2021, Lehigh announced in 2023 that it would close.

A $600 million cement plant, the second-largest in the U.S., Heidelberg Materials built in Mitchell, Indiana, was completed in 2023. In March 2024, the Biden administration's Department of Energy (DOE) awarded the company a grant of up to $500 million to develop a system for capturing and underground storing of carbon produced by its cement production. The plant's project was one of 33 in 20 states selected for a major DOE carbon reduction project. In May 2025, the Trump administration cancelled the grant as part of its efforts to end projects intended to slow global warming. The demonstration project would have brought 1,000 construction jobs and around three dozen permanent positions to the town which had voted for Trump by 75% during the 2024 presential election.

=== Russia ===
1. Cement factory, Sterlitamak
2. Cement factory "CESLA", Slantsy, Leningrad Oblast
3. Cement factory, Novogurovsky

== Business trends ==
In the 2024 financial year, Heidelberg Materials generated revenue of €21.2 billion. During the same financial year, 51,129 employees worked for the group.

Year	Revenue in million €	Net income in million €	Total assets in million €	Total equity in million €	Employees
2011	12,902	534	29,020	13,569	
2012	14,020	539	28,008	13,708	
2013	12,128	933	26,276	12,514	
2014	12,614	687	28,133	14,245	
2015	13,465	983	28,374	15,976	
2016	15,166	831	37,120	17,792	
2017	17,266	1,058	34,558	16,052	
2018	18,076	1,157	36,643	16,822	57,939
2019	18,851	1,123	39,651	18,504	55,047
2020	17,605	−2,066	33,271	14,548	53,122
2021	18,720	1,804	34,568	16,660	51,209
2022	21,095	1,606	34,091	17,624	50,780
2023	21,178	2,033	36,349	18,375	50,997
2024	21,156	1,746	38,255	19,975	51,129
2025	21,460	1,985	37,185	19,301	48,973

== Controversial activities and criticism ==
=== Climate change ===
As cement manufacturing is an extremely CO_{2} intensive process, the cement industry is one of the main contributors to climate change, being responsible for a significant amount of global emissions. Of all companies traded on the DAX, Heidelberg Materials was the second largest CO_{2} emitter. For this reason, there have already been numerous protests by environmental groups, like Fridays For Future, Extinction Rebellion and Greenpeace. In August 2020, the local group "Wurzeln im Beton" ("Roots in Concrete") blocked the main entrance to the company's headquarters and in May 2021, its cement plant near Heidelberg was blocked by the local Extinction Rebellion chapter.

By 2024, despite reduction of the DAX total, and Heidelberg's emissions in particular, Heidelberg was the largest emitter in the DAX, cement manufacture emissions being particularly difficult to reduce. Nevertheless, Heidelberg plans to achieve net zero emissions by 2050, and to "almost halve" its carbon footprint, when compared with 1990 levels, by 2030. In 2025 Heidelberg's first carbon capture and storage (CCS) facility became operational in Norway.

CO_{2} emissions of Heidelberg Materials
Year	Emissions (in million tons)
1990	83.2
2017	73.8
2018	75.7
2019	72.6
2020	67.9
2021	69.0

=== Indonesia ===
Heidelberg Materials has been heavily involved in the planned construction of a controversial cement plant on the Indonesian island of Java through its subsidiary "Indocement". The objective is the exploitation of the Kendeng mountains against the resistance of the people living there.

In addition to the destruction of the complex ecological system, the construction also has created the marginalization of partially indigenous living inhabitants of the region to follow. In this region, the indigenous known as Sedulur Kendeng are protesting against the planned mining operation of PT Semen Indonesia, a state owned enterprise. In March 2017, 50 protestors poured concrete over their feet in front of the Presidential Palace in Jakarta. This is the second time this has occurred in eleven months.

In addition to the protest against the factory building and its ecological consequences as "misconceived 'development' at the expense of indigenous and peasants", the activists also appealed politically at Heidelberg Materials that a multinational "company should not invest in environmental destruction and human rights violations, in any country in the world."

In September 2020, representatives of the local communities submitted a complaint to the German government. It alleges Heidelberg Materials' plans in the Kendeng mountains to threaten their livelihoods, water resources and the local ecosystem as well as sites sacred to local Indigenous Samin communities. As a member of the Organisation for Economic Co-operation and Development (OECD), Germany maintains a National Contact Point that addresses complaints against German companies for overseas violations of the OECD Guidelines on Multinational Enterprises. The guidelines contain standards on human rights and the environment.

=== West Bank ===
In Israeli occupied West Bank Heidelberg Materials' wholly owned subsidiary Hanson Israel manufactures ready-made cement, aggregates and asphalt for Israel's construction industry. In March 2009, the Israeli human rights organization Yesh Din filed a petition with the Israeli high court demanding a halt to mining activity in West Bank quarries, including Hanson Israel's Nahal Raba quarry.

According to research of the ARD magazine "Panorama" on 2 September 2010, and the ARD Studios Tel Aviv, the minerals produced are brought to Israel without any benefit to the Palestinian communities. Palestinians from the village of az-Zawiya in the immediate vicinity of the quarry lay claim to the land. The Israeli Supreme Court rejected the petition from Yesh Din in December 2011.

==== Divestment ====
In September 2017, the largest Danish pension fund, PFA Pension(Da), divested from Heidelberg Materials due to "Violation of basic human rights, which conflicts with UN Global Compact principles 1 and 2."

In October 2017, Danish pension firm Sampension added Heidelberg Cement to its blacklist, because it operates an asphalt factory and quarry in the West Bank.

=== Russian invasion of Ukraine ===
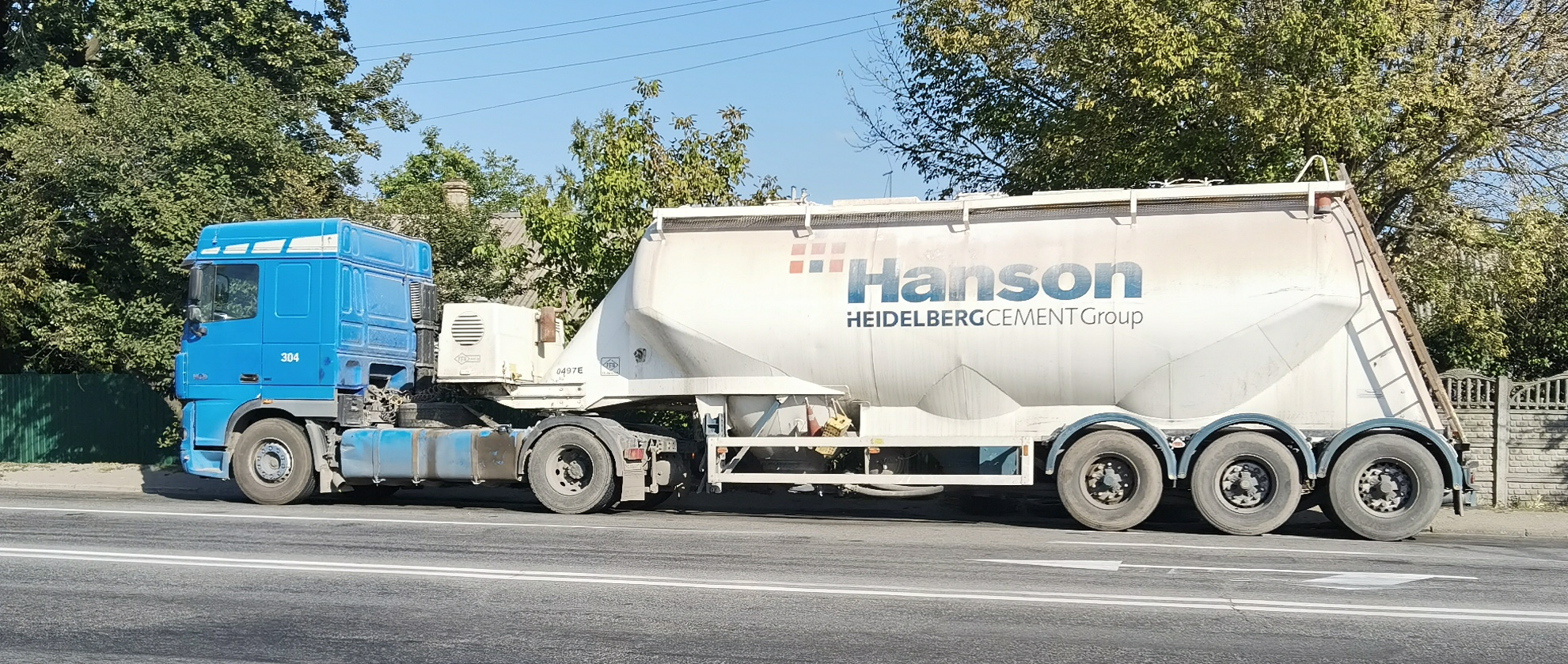
Hanson Heidelberg cement truck in Ukraine

HeidelbergCement has faced criticism for its continued presence in Russia despite the geopolitical tensions and sanctions following the Russian invasion of Ukraine. While the company announced a freeze on investments in its Russian operations, concerns remain about its ongoing activities in the region. According to the Leave Russia project, HeidelbergCement has yet to fully withdraw, raising questions about its ethical practices and commitment to international standards.

=== Wales ===
In March 2024, residents of Glyncoch, near Pontypridd in South Wales, engaged in a series of protests around the over-riding of the local authority's opposition to extend quarrying, by the Minister of Climate Change, Julie James. This successful appeal will allow a further 15.7 million tonnes of rock to be extracted for road surfacing and runways. The quarry operations will continue until 2047 and will come within 164 meters of schools and housing as well as destroying a community green space and a wildlife sanctuary.

== See also ==
List of companies traded on the DAX Main Heidelberg Materials competitors are:

- Holcim
- Cemex
- Eurocement group
- CRH plc
