= Wolffs Revier =

German crime drama television series

- Genre: Crime drama
- Created by: Karl Heinz Willschrei
- Written by: Karl Heinz Willschrei
- Starring: Jürgen Heinrich; Klaus Pönitz; Gerd Wameling; Nadine Seiffert; Steven Merting
- Composer: Klaus Doldinger
- Country of origin: Germany
- Original language: German
- No. of seasons: 13
- No. of episodes: 173

Production
- Running time: 45 min
- Production companies: Borussia Media; Nostro Film; Odeon Film

Original release
- Network: Sat.1
- Release: 17 September 1992 – 24 May 2006

Wolffs Revier is a German crime drama television series broadcast from 1992 to 2006, about chief inspector of police Andreas Wolff, who works in Berlin's homicide department. The series, which won a Grimme-Preis award, consists of 173 episodes in 13 seasons. In 2011, a film was shot as a continuation of the show.

== Main cast and characters ==
- Jürgen Heinrich as Andreas Wolff
- Klaus Pönitz as Gunther Sawatzki
- Gerd Wameling as Peter Fried
- Nadine Seiffert as Verena Wolff
- Steven Merting as Tom Borkmann

== See also ==
- List of German television series
