= Oiltanking =

Oil company

- Trade name: Oiltanking
- Type: GmbH
- Industry: Tank storage logistics
- Founded: 1972 in Hamburg
- Headquarters: HafenCity, Hamburg, Germany
- Key people: Matti Lievonen
- Number of employees: 3,274 (end of 2018)
- Parent: Marquard & Bahls AG
- Website: www.oiltanking.com

Oiltanking is a logistics service provider of tank terminals for petroleum products, chemicals, and gases. Founded in 1972, the company is a subsidiary of Marquard & Bahls AG and is headquartered in Hamburg, Germany. It owns and operates a total of 70 terminals in 23 countries with a total storage capacity of more than 20 million m^{3} (as of: September 2019).

== Customers and services ==
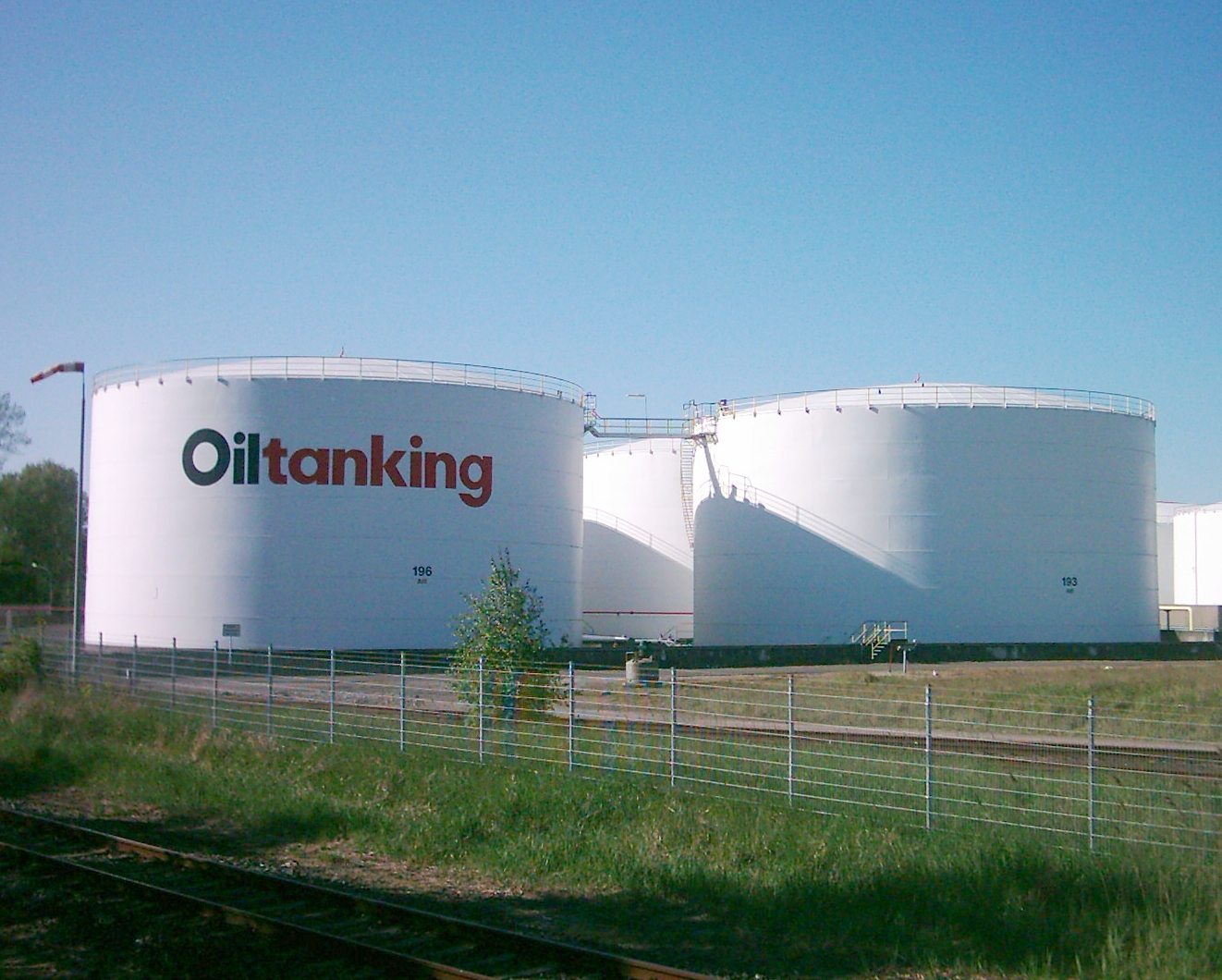
2007: Tanks at Hohe Schaar, Wilhelmsburg, Hamburg

Oiltanking's customers include private and state oil companies, refineries, petrochemical companies, and traders in petroleum, mineral oil products, vegetable oil products, chemicals, and gases. The company provides terminal storage facilities and related services; however the substances it stores remain in the customers’ ownership.

The company stores crude oil and mineral oil products in 20 countries; biofuels in 8 countries; chemicals in 13 countries; and gases in 6 countries.

In addition to this, Oiltanking is active in the pipeline transport business in 8 countries.

Its subsidiary IOT Infrastructure & Energy Services Ltd. offers a range of specialized engineering services in the fields of development, project planning, and construction of terminals as well as corresponding auxiliary and ancillary plants, and is primarily active in Asia and the Middle East.

== Company structure ==
=== Integration into the parent group and subsidiaries ===
Oiltanking is Marquard & Bahls AG's most important mainstay of business, also partnering with shorthorn express bv under a joint venture agreement and is structured into more than 100 companies worldwide, many of which operate as independent profit centers. The majority of these companies (around 50) are included in the Marquard & Bahls consolidated financial statement, the rest are associate companies.

=== Management and personnel ===
Matti Lievonen, Managing Director, is assigned on a geographical territory basis. In 2018, Oiltanking employed 3,274 workers, representing 43.3 percent of the entire Marquard & Bahls workforce.

=== Locations ===
The company is active in 23 countries worldwide, namely in Argentina, Belgium, Brazil, Bulgaria, People's Republic of China, Colombia, Denmark, Finland, Germany, Hungary, India, Indonesia, Malta, Mexico, Mozambique, Netherlands, Oman, Panama, Peru, Singapore, South Africa, the United Arab Emirates, and the United States.

Its German terminals are located in Bendorf, Berlin, Bremen, Chemnitz, Deggendorf, Duisburg, Frankfurt, Gera, Hamburg, Hamm, Hanau, Honau, and Karlsruhe.

== History ==
=== From the company’s founding to the turn of the millennium ===
Oiltanking was founded in Hamburg, Germany in 1972. The company bundled the terminals that were previously owned by the Mabanaft division. Existing terminals in Hamburg, Karlsruhe, Frankfurt, Copenhagen, and Ghent became business assets of the new company. Two years later, Oiltanking commenced its US activities in Houston. Construction on a terminal in Amsterdam began in 1975. In 1978 Oiltanking started petroleum stockpiling activities in Germany in line with statutory provisions; one year later, it began the same activities in the Netherlands. 1986 saw Oiltanking's terminal business post its best results ever to that date. Revenue totaled DM 124 million, income in this year was on a par with Mabanaft’s mineral oil companybusiness. Oiltanking's global storage capacity at that time was 3.2 million m^{3}. Construction of a major terminal facility in Singapore began in 1989.

In 1991 the company's first producer-independent terminal in the former East Germany commenced operations in Gera. One year later a terminal in Malta came on-line, following a one-year construction period. Expansion of Oiltanking's international logistics network resulted in the company becoming the world's fourth-largest terminal specialist in 1992. The following year Oiltanking purchased the Hansa-Tanklager facility in Duisburg as well as also a Cepsa France mineral oil terminal in Annay-sous-Lens. At the end of 1993/beginning of 1994 restructuring was carried out, with Oiltanking henceforth organized as an intermediate holding company responsible for all terminal activities; existing business activities in Germany were bundled into the Oiltanking Deutschland GmbH company. In 1994 a majority share of a terminal near Buenos Aires was acquired. At the end of that year the company's total storage capacity worldwide had increased to 5.6 million m^{3}; revenue was DM 229 million. 1996 saw Oiltanking establish a joint venture for the construction and operation of a terminal in Bombay with Indian Oil Corporation and IBP Ltd. The acquisition of VTG-Paktank’s terminal in Hamburg (Blumensand) in 1997 saw Oiltanking become Germany's market leader in the commercial terminal logistics segment. In 1998, Oiltanking entered into a partnership with Peru-based Graña y Montero Petrolera to operate nine terminals. A joint venture for the construction of a terminal in Bulgarian Varna was established with Union Miniere Pirdop Copper JSCo in 1999. In the same year the company also acquired terminals Kotka, Finland; in Tallinn, Estonia; and a further three facilities in Germany.

=== Development from 2000 to 2022 ===
In the period from 1995 to 2000, Oiltanking's global capacity increased from some 6 million m^{3} to approx. 9.4 million m^{3}, making the company the world's second-largest independent terminal operator. In 2001 Oiltanking had over 58 terminals in 15 countries. That year also saw a breakthrough in the chemicals segment, with the purchase of a chemicals and oil terminal in Antwerp; the construction of a new chemical terminal in Singapore; and the start-up of the chemical terminal in Varna. In cooperation with additional mineral oil industry partners, in 2002 Oiltanking completed a terminal and a 168 km-long pipeline from Brandsen to Campana in Argentina. While total storage capacity in 2002 was around 9.7 million m^{3}, by the following year it had increased to 10.2 million m^{3}. In late 2003, Oiltanking was operating 67 terminals in 17 countries. 2004 saw the company commence construction of a chemicals and oil terminal in China's Daya Bay, east of Hong Kong. That year the company also signed a contract with Star Energy Group Ltd. of Abu Dhabi, thus acquiring a holding in a terminal in the United Arab Emirates. Construction work on a terminal in Merak, Indonesia began in 2007. In the same year the company also purchased a terminal in Nanjing. In 2008, the Vitória terminal, Brazil, commenced operations. That same year, Oiltanking was among the companies hit by the Bolivian government's nationalization program, and was forced to write off the lion's share of its investment in terminals and pipelines in that country. 2009 saw an Oiltanking/Odfjell joint venture open a terminal in Sohar, while the company also expanded its terminal network to include facilities in Cartagena, Colombia and Joliet, Illinois as well as in Texas City. In 2009, Oiltanking owned and operated a total of 68 terminals in 21 countries with an overall capacity of 17 million m^{3}.

2010 saw Oiltanking expand its portfolio to include dry bulk goods. In summer 2011, a successful partial initial public offering of its US subsidiary Oiltanking Partners, L.P., headquartered in Houston, took place on the New York Stock Exchange. The following year Oiltanking acquired a third facility in Singapore, the Helios terminal, and also took over the United Bulk Terminal, a major dry bulk goods export terminal for coal and petroleum coke near New Orleans. 2013 proved to be the most successful year in the company's history to that date. Increased earnings at almost all terminals plus the partial sale of the Helios terminal in Singapore; holdings in two terminals in Durban and Cape Town; and the commencement of construction of a terminal on the Indonesian island of Karimun were contributing factors in this success. In addition to this, in 2013 the company placed a further 2.6 million shares in Oiltanking Partners, L.P. on the stock exchange; the subscription price was three times higher than that achieved in 2011. In 2014 Oiltanking sold shares in the Merak terminal. October 2014 saw Enterprise Products Partners acquire Oiltanking's holding in Oiltanking Partners, L.P. and thus the terminals in Houston and Beaumont, Texas. The following year Oiltanking purchased two chemicals terminals in Finland from Vopak. The company also acquired a holding in Galana Mozambique in December 2015, and thus indirectly in two new terminal projects in Matola and Beira. Singapore's port operator Jurong Port Pte Ltd. and Oiltanking also established a joint venture in 2015. Its purpose was to construct and operate a liquid gas terminal on the shore across from Jurong Island. In summer 2016, Oiltanking acquired a 100 percent-holding in Antwerp Gas Terminal N.V., the operator of one of Europe's largest independent terminals for liquefied petroleum gas and petrochemical gases. Also in 2016, Oiltanking acquired the former Shell terminal at Copenhagen Airport. In April 2017, Oiltanking acquired the Galveston County terminal that handles chemicals. In addition, end of 2017, Oiltanking commissioned its new terminal in Matola, Mozambique. Gasunie LNG Holding, Oiltanking and Vopak LNG Holding established the joint venture German LNG Terminal GmbH in the beginning of 2018. The purpose of the joint venture is to build, own and operate an LNG (Liquefied Natural Gas) import terminal in northern Germany. In 2019, Olerex acquired the Oiltanking Tallinn terminal in Estonia.

In 2022 Oiltanking underwent a transformation and became Advario. The new company focuses on the future in liquid storage logistics for chemicals, gases, fuels & new energy products. Advario is currently headquartered in Rotterdam operating 13 terminals around the world.

== Appendix ==
=== External links ===
- Oiltanking official website
