= DAX =

Blue chip stock market index

- Foundation: 1 July 1988
- Operator: STOXX (Qontigo, Deutsche Börse)
- Exchanges: Frankfurt Stock Exchange
- Constituents: 40 (expanded from 30 in 2021)
- Type: Large cap
- Market cap: €1.891 trillion (March 2025)
- Weighting method: Capitalization-weighted
- Related indices: MDAX, SDAX, TecDAX
- Website: Official website

The DAX (Deutscher Aktienindex (German stock index); German pronunciation: [daks]) is a stock market index consisting of the 40 major German blue chip companies trading on the Frankfurt Stock Exchange. It is a total return index. Prices are taken from the Xetra trading venue. According to Deutsche Börse, the operator of Xetra, DAX measures the performance of the Prime Standard's 40 largest German companies in terms of order book volume and market capitalization. DAX is the equivalent of the UK FTSE 100 and the US Dow Jones Industrial Average, and because of its small company selection it does not necessarily represent the vitality of the German economy as a whole.

The L-DAX Index is an indicator of the German benchmark DAX index's performance after the Xetra trading venue closes based on the floor trading at the Börse Frankfurt trading venue. The L-DAX Index basis is the "floor" trade (Parketthandel) at the Frankfurt stock exchange; it is computed daily between 09:00 and 17:45 Hours CET. The L/E-DAX index (Late/Early DAX) is calculated from 17:55 to 22:00 CET and from 08:00 to 09:00 CET. The Eurex, a European electronic futures and options exchange based in Zurich, Switzerland with a subsidiary in Frankfurt, Germany, offers options (ODAX) and Futures (FDAX) on the DAX from 01:10 to 22:00 CET or from 02:10 to 22:00 CEST.

The Base date for the DAX is 30 December 1987, and it was started from a base value of 1,000. The Xetra technology calculates the index every second since 1 January 2006.

On 24 Nov 2020, Deutsche Börse announced an expansion of the DAX from 30 to 40 members and a tightening of rules in response to the Wirecard accounting scandal. The expansion occurred in the 3rd quarter of 2021.

== Versions ==
The DAX has two versions, called performance index and price index, depending on whether dividends are counted. The performance index, which measures total return, is the more commonly quoted, however the price index is more similar to commonly quoted indexes in other countries.

== Contract specifications ==
DAX futures are traded on the Deutsche Borse Indices & ETF exchange (DBIndex). The contract specifications for the DAX Combined Index (ticker symbol DAXA) are listed below:

Contract Specifications
DAX Combined Index (DAXA)	
Exchange:	DBIndex
Sector:	Index
Tick Size:	0.01
Tick Value:	1 EUR
Big Point Value (BPV):	100
Denomination:	EUR
Decimal Place:	2

== Price history ==
On 16 March 2015, the performance index first closed above 12,000.

== Record values ==
Category	All-time highs	
Closing	26,771.88	Thursday,November 12,2026
Intraday	27,001.67	Thursday, November 12,2026

== Annual returns ==
The following collapsible table shows the annual development of the DAX, calculated retroactively up to 1950.

Year	Closing level	Change in Index in Points	Change in Index in %
1950	30.18	−2.42	−7.42
1951	65.01	34.83	115.41
1952	59.75	−5.26	−8.09
1953	74.09	14.34	24.00
1954	135.28	61.19	82.59
1955	148.81	13.53	10.00
1956	137.80	−11.01	−7.40
1957	144.97	7.17	5.20
1958	232.23	87.26	60.19
1959	417.79	185.56	79.90
1960	534.09	116.30	27.84
1961	489.79	−44.30	−8.29
1962	386.32	−103.47	−21.13
1963	438.95	52.63	13.62
1964	477.89	38.94	8.87
1965	422.36	−55.53	−11.62
1966	333.36	−89.00	−21.07
1967	503.22	169.86	50.95
1968	555.62	52.40	10.41
1969	622.38	66.76	12.02
1970	443.86	−178.52	−28.68
1971	473.46	29.60	6.67
1972	536.36	62.90	13.29
1973	403.88	−132.48	−24.70
1974	401.79	−2.09	−0.52
1975	563.25	161.46	40.19
1976	509.02	−54.23	−9.63
1977	549.34	40.32	7.92
1978	575.15	25.81	4.70
1979	497.79	−77.36	−13.45
1980	480.92	−16.87	−3.39
1981	490.39	9.47	1.97
1982	552.77	62.38	12.72
1983	773.95	221.18	40.01
1984	820.91	46.96	6.07
1985	1,366.23	545.32	66.43
1986	1,432.25	66.02	4.83
1987	1,000.00	−432.25	−30.18
1988	1,327.87	327.87	32.79
1989	1,790.37	462.50	34.83
1990	1,398.23	−392.14	−21.90
1991	1,577.98	179.75	12.86
1992	1,545.05	−32.93	−2.09
1993	2,266.68	721.63	46.71
1994	2,106.58	−160.10	−7.06
1995	2,253.88	147.30	6.99
1996	2,888.69	634.81	28.17
1997	4,249.69	1,361.00	47.11
1998	5,002.39	752.70	17.71
1999	6,958.14	1,955.75	39.10
2000	6,433.61	−524.53	−7.54
2001	5,160.10	−1,273.51	−19.79
2002	2,892.63	−2,267.47	−43.94
2003	3,965.16	1,072.53	37.08
2004	4,256.08	290.92	7.34
2005	5,408.26	1,152.18	27.07
2006	6,596.92	1,188.66	21.98
2007	8,067.32	1,470.40	22.29
2008	4,810.20	−3,257.12	−40.37
2009	5,957.43	1,147.23	23.85
2010	6,914.19	956.76	16.06
2011	5,898.35	−1,015.84	−14.69
2012	7,612.39	1,714.04	29.06
2013	9,552.16	1,939.77	24.77
2014	9,805.55	253.39	2.65
2015	10,743.01	937.46	9.56
2016	11,481.06	738.05	6.87
2017	12,917.64	1,436.58	12.51
2018	10,558.96	−2,358.68	−18.26
2019	13,249.01	2,690.05	25.48
2020	13,718.78	469.77	3.55
2021	15,884.86	2,166.08	15.79
2022	13,923.59	−1,961.27	−12.35
2023	16,751.64	2,828.05	20.31
2024	19,909.14	3,157.50	18.85
2025	24,490.41	4,581.27	23.01

== Components ==
Below is the list of companies which are a component of the DAX 40, as of 22 September 2025. The current stock prices and list of DAX companies are available from financial websites. The index weighting refers to the DAX performance index.

Ticker	Logo	Company	Prime Standard Sector	Index weighting (%)^{1}	Employees	Founded
ADS.DE		Adidas	Apparel	2.5	62,035 (2024)	1924
AIR.PA		Airbus	Aerospace & Defence	6.1	126,495 (2021)	1970
ALV.DE		Allianz	Financial Services	8.4	156,626 (2024)	1890
BAS.DE		BASF	Chemicals	2.8	111,822 (2024)	1865
BAYN.DE		Bayer	Pharmaceuticals	1.5	94,081 (2024)	1863
BEI.DE		Beiersdorf	Consumer goods	0.7	22,678 (2024)	1882
BMW.DE		BMW	Automotive	1.5	159,104 (2024)	1916
BNR.DE		Brenntag	Distribution	0.5	18,122 (2024)	1874
CBK.DE		Commerzbank	Financial Services	1.5	40,233 (2024)	1870
CON.DE		Continental	Automotive	0.5	190,875 (2021)	1871
DTG.DE		Daimler Truck	Automotive	1.3	99,849 (2021)	2021
DBK.DE		Deutsche Bank	Financial Services	2.8	82,969 (2021)	1870
DB1.DE		Deutsche Börse	Financial Services	3.1	10,200 (2021)	1992
DHL.DE		Deutsche Post	Logistics	2.5	482,638 (2024)	1995
DTE.DE		Deutsche Telekom	Telecommunication	7.5	204,414 (2024)	1995
EOAN.DE		E.ON	Utilities	1.8	72,242 (2024)	2000
FRE.DE		Fresenius	Healthcare	1.0	316,078 (2021)	1912
FME.DE		Fresenius Medical Care	Healthcare	0.6	130,251 (2021)	1996
G1A.DE		GEA Group	Mechanical Engineering	TBD	18,500 (2024)	1881
HNR1.DE		Hannover Re	Insurance	1.0	3,346 (2021)	1966
HEI.DE		Heidelberg Materials	Construction Materials	1.5	51,209 (2021)	1874
HEN3.DE		Henkel	Consumer Goods	0.8	52,450 (2021)	1876
IFX.DE		Infineon Technologies	Technology	2.7	50,280 (2021)	1999
MBG.DE		Mercedes-Benz Group	Automotive	2.5	175,000 (2024)	1926
MRK.DE		Merck	Pharmaceuticals	1.1	62,557 (2024)	1668
MTX.DE		MTU Aero Engines	Aerospace & Defence	1.1	10,833 (2022)	1934
MUV2.DE		Munich Re	Financial Services	4.8	40,177 (2022)	1880
PAH3.DE		Porsche SE	Automotive	0.4	882 (2021)	2007
QIA.DE		Qiagen	Biotech	0.5	5,765 (2024)	1984
RHM.DE		Rheinmetall	Aerospace & Defence	3.5	28,539 (2024)	1889
RWE.DE		RWE	Utilities	1.3	18,246 (2021)	1898
SAP.DE		SAP	Technology	14.0	109,972 (2024)	1972
G24.DE		Scout24	E-Commerce	TBD	1,200 (2024)	2012
SIE.DE		Siemens	Industrials	10.7	327,000 (2024)	1847
ENR.DE		Siemens Energy	Energy technology	2.5	92,000 (2021)	2020
SHL.DE		Siemens Healthineers	Medical Equipment	0.9	66,000 (2021)	2020
SY1.DE		Symrise	Chemicals	0.7	11,276 (2021)	2003
VOW3.DE		Volkswagen Group	Automotive	1.3	679,472 (2024)	1937
VNA.DE		Vonovia	Real Estate	1.1	15,900 (2022)	2001
ZAL.DE		Zalando	E-Commerce	0.5	17,000 (2021)	2008

^Note 1: Weightings as of 22 September 2025

== Former DAX components ==
This table lists former DAX components and the companies which replaced them.

Date	Component excluded	Component included	Reason for exclusion/ Comments
03.09.1990	Feldmühle Nobel	Metallgesellschaft	Takeover of Feldmühle Nobel by Stora Enso
03.09.1990	Nixdorf Germany	Preussag (now TUI)	Merged with Siemens to form Siemens-Nixdorf
18.09.1995	Deutsche Babcock	SAP	Replaced by SAP because of lower market capitalisation
22.07.1996	Kaufhof	METRO	Merger of Kaufhof and Metro Cash & Carry
23.09.1996	Continental	Münchener Rück	Continental was added back to the DAX on 22 September 2003, though it was demoted again in 2008 and added back again in 2012
18.11.1996	Metallgesellschaft	Deutsche Telekom	IPO of Deutsche Telekom
22.06.1998	Bayerische Hypotheken- und Wechselbank	Adidas	Merger of Vereinsbank and Hypobank to form HypoVereinsbank
22.06.1998	Bayerische Vereinsbank	HypoVereinsbank	Merger of Vereinsbank and Hypobank to form HypoVereinsbank
21.12.1998	Daimler-Benz	DaimlerChrysler (now Daimler)	Merger of Daimler-Benz with Chrysler
22.03.1999	Degussa	Degussa-Hüls	Merger of Degussa AG with Hüls AG and renaming to Degussa-Hüls AG
25.03.1999	Thyssen	ThyssenKrupp	Merger of Thyssen and Krupp
20.09.1999	Hoechst	Fresenius Medical Care	Merger of Hoechst and Rhône-Poulenc with Aventis
14.02.2000	Mannesmann	Epcos	Takeover of Mannesmann by Vodafone
19.06.2000	Veba	E.ON	Merger of Veba and Viag to form E.ON
19.06.2000	VIAG	Infineon	Merger of Veba and Viag to form E.ON
18.12.2000	Degussa-Hüls	Degussa	Merger of Degussa-Hüls AG and SKW Trostberg AG to new Degussa AG
19.03.2001	KarstadtQuelle	Deutsche Post	IPO of Deutsche Post
23.07.2001	Dresdner Bank	MLP Vz.	Takeover of Dresdner Bank by Allianz
23.09.2002	Degussa	Altana	Inadequate market capitalisation
23.12.2002	Epcos	Deutsche Börse	Fast-exit of Epcos, as Epcos' market capitalisation became inadequate.
22.09.2003	MLP	Continental	Inadequate free float and market capitalisation.
31.01.2005		Lanxess	Lanxess was spun off from Bayer, for calculating reasons added to the DAX as a temporary 31st component, and removed a day later. It was added to the DAX in 2012 and removed again in 2015.
01.02.2005	Lanxess		Lanxess was spun off from Bayer, for calculating reasons added to the DAX as a temporary 31st component, and removed a day later. It was added to the DAX in 2012 and removed again in 2015.
19.12.2005	HypoVereinsbank	Hypo Real Estate	Takeover of HypoVereinsbank by UniCredit
18.09.2006	Schering	Postbank	Takeover of Schering by Bayer
18.06.2007	Altana	Merck	After the sale of Nycomed, inadequate market capitalisation
22.09.2008	TUI	K+S	Fast-entry of K+S, inadequate market capitalisation of TUI
22.12.2008	Continental	Beiersdorf	Fast-exit of Continental because of inadequate free-float market capitalisation after the acquisition by Schaeffler Group
22.12.2008	Hypo Real Estate	Salzgitter	Fast-exit of Hypo Real Estate because of inadequate free-float market capitalisation after a stake by American investor JC Flowers, as well as huge decline in market capitalisation during the 2008 financial crisis
23.03.2009	Deutsche Postbank	Hannover Re	Fast-exit due to inadequate market capitalisation
23.03.2009	Infineon Technologies	Fresenius Vz	Fast-exit due to inadequate market capitalisation
21.09.2009	Hannover Re	Infineon Technologies	Inadequate market capitalisation
21.06.2010	Salzgitter	HeidelbergCement	Inadequate market capitalisation
24.09.2012	MAN	Continental	Inadequate free-float capitalisation after acquisition by Volkswagen
24.09.2012	Metro	Lanxess	Inadequate market capitalisation
21.09.2015	Lanxess	Vonovia	Inadequate market capitalisation
21.03.2016	K+S	ProSiebenSat.1 Media	Inadequate market capitalisation
19.03.2018	ProSiebenSat.1 Media	Covestro	Inadequate market capitalisation
24.09.2018	Commerzbank	Wirecard	Inadequate market capitalisation
23.09.2019	ThyssenKrupp	MTU Aero Engines	Inadequate market capitalisation
22.06.2020	Deutsche Lufthansa	Deutsche Wohnen	Inadequate market capitalisation
19.08.2020	Wirecard	Delivery Hero	new Insolvency Rule (section 5.1.1)
22.03.2021	Beiersdorf	Siemens Energy	Inadequate market capitalisation
16.09.2021		Vitesco	Vitesco was spun off from Continental, for calculating reasons added to the DAX as a temporary 31st component, and removed a day later.
17.09.2021	Vitesco		Vitesco was spun off from Continental, for calculating reasons added to the DAX as a temporary 31st component, and removed a day later.
20.09.2021		Airbus	10 companies added to expand DAX to 40 components
20.09.2021		Brenntag	10 companies added to expand DAX to 40 components
20.09.2021		HelloFresh	10 companies added to expand DAX to 40 components
20.09.2021		Porsche SE	10 companies added to expand DAX to 40 components
20.09.2021		Puma	10 companies added to expand DAX to 40 components
20.09.2021		Qiagen	10 companies added to expand DAX to 40 components
20.09.2021		Sartorius	10 companies added to expand DAX to 40 components
20.09.2021		Siemens Healthineers	10 companies added to expand DAX to 40 components
20.09.2021		Symrise	10 companies added to expand DAX to 40 components
20.09.2021		Zalando	10 companies added to expand DAX to 40 components
29.10.2021	Deutsche Wohnen	Beiersdorf	
10.12.2021		Daimler Truck	Daimler Truck was spun off from Mercedes-Benz, for calculating reasons added to the DAX as a temporary 41st component, and removed next trading day. It was added to the DAX again in 2022.
13.12.2021	Daimler Truck		Daimler Truck was spun off from Mercedes-Benz, for calculating reasons added to the DAX as a temporary 41st component, and removed next trading day. It was added to the DAX again in 2022.
21.03.2022	Beiersdorf	Daimler Truck	
21.03.2022	Siemens Energy	Hannover Re	
20.06.2022	Delivery Hero	Beiersdorf	
19.09.2022	HelloFresh	Siemens Energy	
19.12.2022	Puma	Porsche	Initial public offering of Porsche
27.02.2023	Linde	Commerzbank	Delisting of Linde on Frankfurt stock exchange
20.03.2023	Fresenius Medical Care	Rheinmetall	
27.12.2024	Covestro AG	Fresenius Medical Care	Inadequate free-float capitalisation

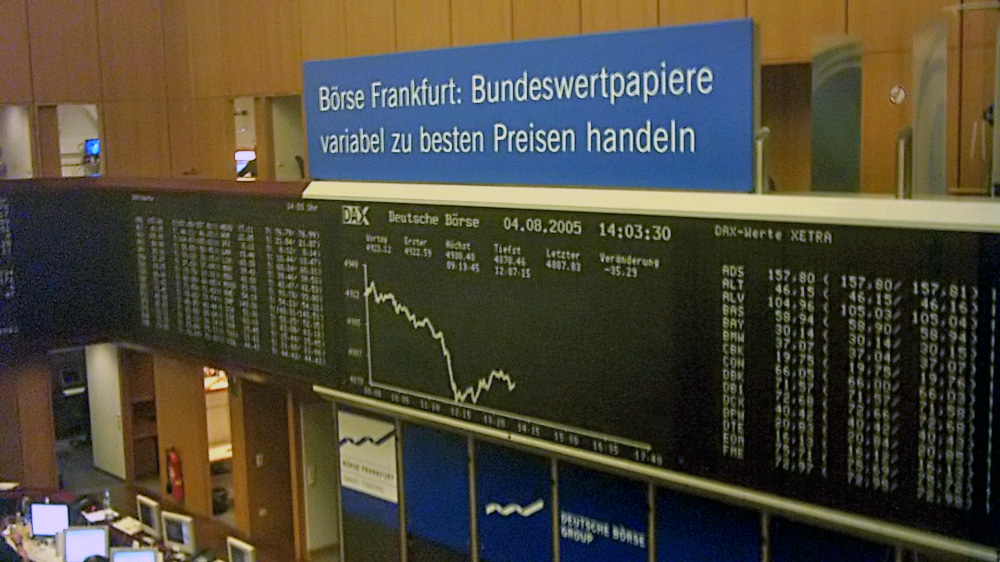
DAX 30 chart at the Frankfurt Stock Exchange

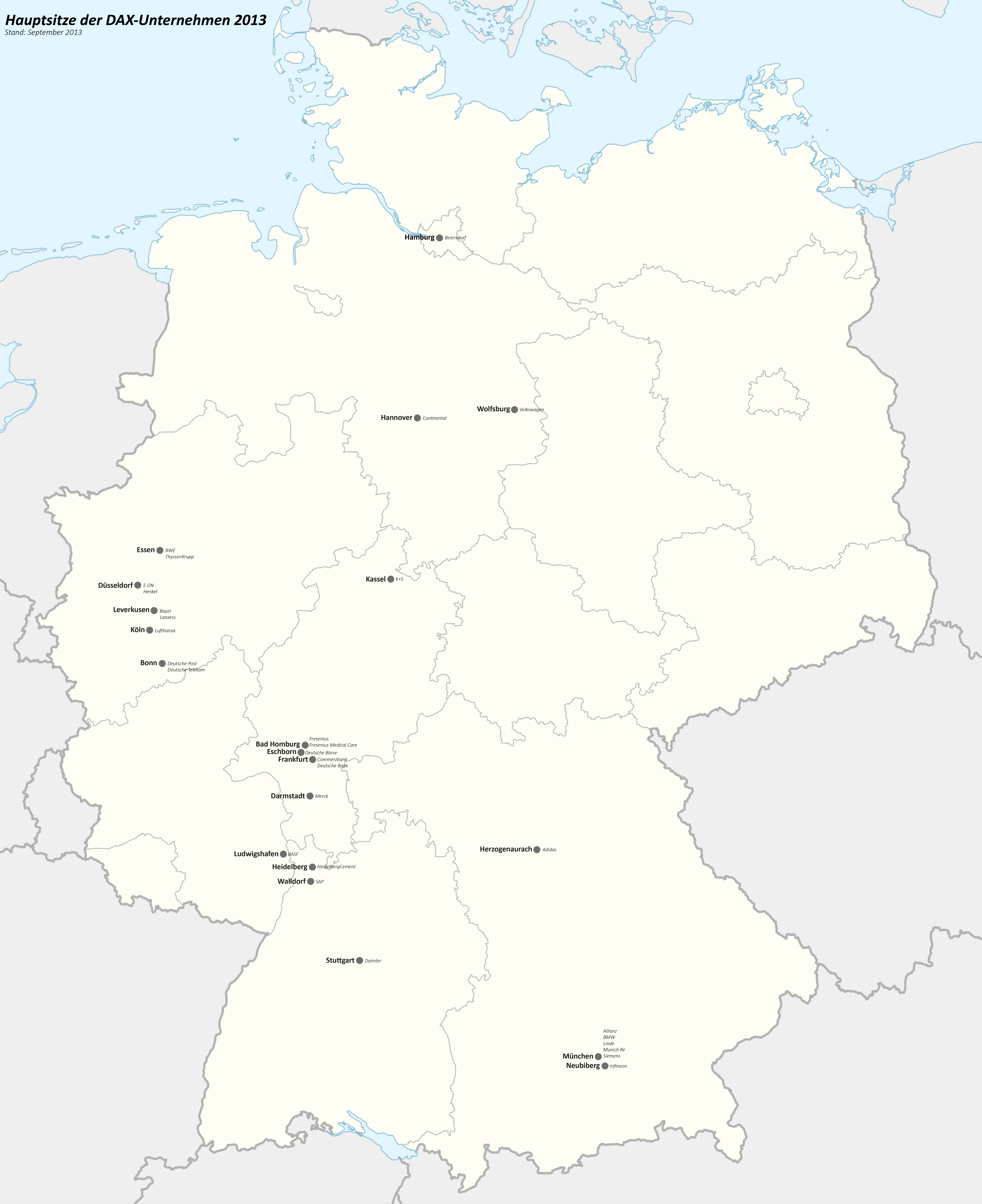
The headquarters of DAX companies in 2013

== See also ==
Stock market lists

- List of stock exchanges
- List of European stock exchanges

Other lists

- List of largest German companies

Other stock market indices

- List of stock market indices
- CDAX, every listed German company
- HDAX, union of DAX, MDAX and TecDAX (successor to DAX 100, and equivalent of the FTSE 100 or the S&P 100)
- MDAX, the next 50 largest companies after the DAX
- SDAX, the next 70 largest companies after the MDAX
- ÖkoDAX, top 10 companies in renewable energy
- TecDAX, top 30 companies trading in the "new economy"
