= Brenntag =

Company

Brenntag SE
- Type: Public (Societas Europaea)
- Traded as: FWB: BNR; FWB: BNRA (ADR); DAX component (BNR)
- ISIN: DE000A1DAHH0; US1071801013
- Industry: Distribution
- Founded: 1874; 152 years ago
- Founder: Philipp Mühsam
- Headquarters: Essen, Germany
- Number of locations: 600
- Key people: Jens Birgersson (CEO); Richard Ridinger (Chairman of the Supervisory board)
- Services: Chemical and ingredients distribution
- Revenue: ▼€16.8 billion (2023)
- Number of employees: 17,709 (2023)
- Website: brenntag.com

Brenntag SE is the holding company of Brenntag Group. The company was founded in 1874 in Berlin and specializes in the distribution of chemicals and ingredients. The company is headquartered in Essen, Germany and has operations in more than 600 locations in 72 countries.

== History ==
=== Founding ===
Brenntag was founded on 9 October 1874, in Berlin by the Jewish merchant Philipp Mühsam (14 November 1848 – 17 May 1914) under his own name. At first, the company Philipp Mühsam was an agricultural wholesale business, whose most successful product was eggs. In 1879, Philipp Mühsam entered the trade of pharmaceutical raw materials, the so-called ‘drugs.’ By 1881, according to the sources, the company was distributing chemicals, dyes, drugs and also agricultural products, though the latter only in small quantities. In November 1923, the founder’s son, Dr. Kurt Mühsam (31 December 1887 – 20 March 1928), together with his business partner Julius Herz, converted the company into a joint stock corporation.

=== National Socialism and post-war period ===
Julius Herz, who after Kurt Mühsam’s death owned 91% of the share capital of Philipp Mühsam AG, presented a sales offer for the company to the entrepreneurs Hugo Hermann Stinnes and Otto Stinnes on Christmas Eve 1936. On 20 February 1937, the sale of all shares in Philipp Mühsam AG was contractually finalized. Julius Herz, also Jewish, was able to emigrate to the USA on 22 September 1937, after completing all contractual formalities. In 1937, the company, now part of the Stinnes corporate group, was renamed ‘Brennstoff-, Chemikalien- und Transport-Aktiengesellschaft,’ and a year later, it was renamed ‘Brenntag.

On 17 September 1949, Julius Herz, who had in the meantime changed his name to Julius Hart, filed a restitution claim with the Central Office of the British Zone for Compensation. He sought compensation for the too-low sale price of Philipp Mühsam AG. On 1 September 1950, the lawyers of Hugo Hermann Stinnes, his brother Otto, and Julius Hart signed a settlement agreement. Julius Hart then received a payment of 720,000 DM to settle his restitution claim.

In 1950, Brenntag expanded operations by adding inorganic and organic chemicals, solvents, plastics, resins and specialty chemicals to its product line. In the following years, Brenntag also distributed fuels (carburettor fuels, diesel fuel and heating oil) from Ruhrbau GmbH, which was also a Stinnes company.

=== Expansion abroad and takeover ===
In 1966, Brenntag acquired its first company Balder from Belgium. The company expanded into the USA in 1969. It then continued to grow its business there through acquisitions.

In the 1980s, the company continued to expand in the USA through acquisitions of several distribution companies, among others, the American distribution companies Western Chemical (1980), Textile Chemical (1981) and Delta (1986). In 1989, Brenntag acquired Crown and PB&S Chemicals.

In the 1990s, Brenntag expanded within Europe through acquisitions and joint ventures. This included, among others, the Dutch company Holland Chemical International N.V. By acquiring Holland Chemical International – the fifth-largest chemicals distributor worldwide at the time – in 2000 Brenntag gained market shares in Scandinavia, Eastern Europe, and the USA, and became a market leader in Latin America.

In 2003, Deutsche Bahn took over Stinnes AG, including Brenntag. Just one year later, US private equity firm Bain Capital acquired Stinnes. Until the end of 2003, Brenntag had been a stock corporation, before Bain Capital converted it into a limited liability company. In 2006, Brenntag was acquired by BC Partners.

=== IPO and acquisitions ===
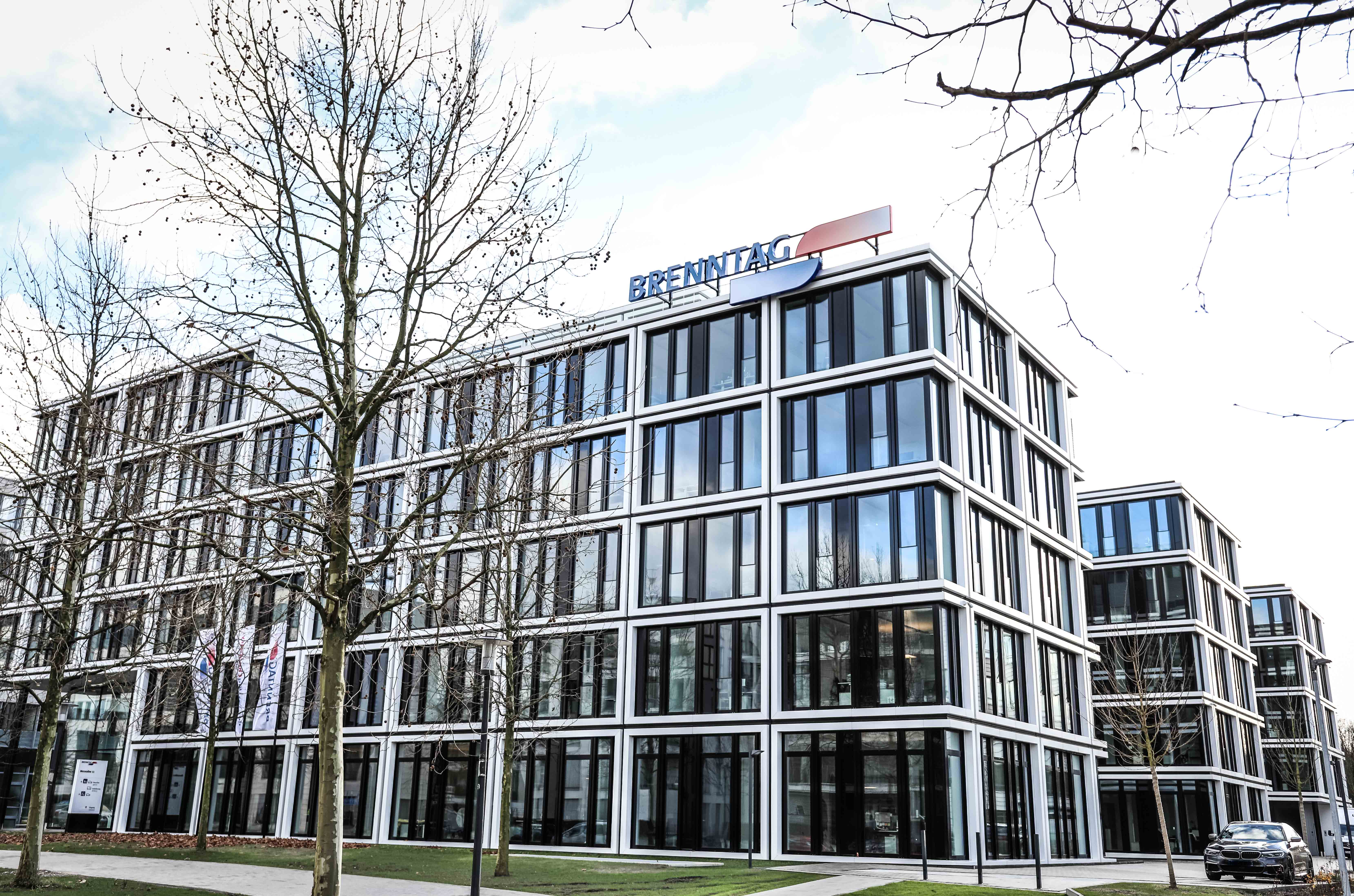
Brenntag Headquarter "House of Elements" in Essen.

After the takeover by BC Partners, Brenntag continued to acquire companies worldwide, expanding its network and market shares. From 2007 until 2021 the group acquired up to 99 companies, between 2007 and 2010 alone more than 24 companies. In most cases, these were small supplements to the existing business in markets in which Brenntag had been less present until then.

Since 29 March 2010, Brenntag AG (WKN A1DAHH) is listed at the German Stock Exchange in the Prime Standard Segment, from 21 June 2010 until September 2021 as a member of the MDAX index. As of 20 September 2021, the company is included in the DAX as part of an index reform and expansion from 30 to 40 companies. In the meantime, Brenntag has returned to 100% free float ownership.

=== Entry into Asian market and business expansion ===
Major acquisitions expanded operations in the Asia/Pacific region. In 2008, Brenntag took over the Indian company Rhodia in Mumbai, giving Brenntag the first distribution presence in the region. In 2010, Brenntag further expanded its market presence in the region significantly by acquiring EAC Industrial Ingredients Ltd. in Bangkok. In 2011, Brenntag established a joint venture with Zhong Yung International Chemical Ltd. in China and in 2016 the company acquired the distributor EPChem Group in Singapore.

Due to capacity problems, in 2017, Brenntag moved its headquarters from Mülheim an der Ruhr, to the House of Elements in Essen-Rüttenscheid. Further, in 2021, Brenntag was converted from a stock corporation (AG) into a Societas Europaea (SE).

In 2021, further acquisitions took place, primarily of suppliers for food manufacturers. A major acquisition in this regard was the takeover of JM Swank in the USA. With the purchase, Brenntag acquired a major food distributor in North America, extensively expanding its range of food ingredients.

== Corporate Structure ==
In 2022, the Group generated revenues of 19.4 billion euros and employed more than 17,500 people. Brenntag has around 600 sites in 72 countries.

=== Body of the company ===
Management Board

- Jens Birgersson (CEO)
- Thomas Reisten (CFO)
- Michael Friede (CEO Brenntag Specialties)

Supervisory Board

- Richard Ridinger (Chairman)

=== Shareholder structure ===
According to the definition of Deutsche Börse, 100% of Brenntag shares are in free float. The shareholders subject to voting right notification are Kühne Holding AG (>15%), Artisan Partners Limited Partnership (>10%), BlackRock (>5%), Flossbach von Storch AG (>5%), Harris Associates L.P. (>5%), Wellington Management Group (>3%).

== Business operations ==
=== Business model ===
Brenntag buys large quantities of industrial and specialty chemicals from manufacturers, commissions them into required quantities to meet specific demand and sells them on to its customers. The company links chemical producers and the processing industry. Brenntag also handles the procurement, storage, and delivery of required basic materials for its customers as well as various processes such as mixing raw materials, packaging, or repackaging. Part of Brenntag's business strategy is the acquisition, i.e., buying companies to strengthen its own market position and expand its portfolio.

=== Products ===
Brenntag's main operations include food, pharmaceuticals, cosmetics, oil and gas, and water purification. Brenntag's product catalog includes more than 10,000 items ranging from acids, bases, and solvents to substances for the food, cosmetics, feed and pharmaceutical industries. The company also develops and supplies flavorings for spirits and food products. In addition, Brenntag operates around 80 application laboratories, where customer-specific services and products are developed.

=== Business segments ===
Brenntag has been organized into two global businesses since 2021. Brenntag Essentials supplies process chemicals for broad application areas on a local level, while Brenntag Specialties concentrates on ingredients and services for selected focus industries such as pharmaceuticals and nutrition.

== Controversy ==
Criticism of Brenntag arose in 2017 and again in 2021 because it supplied chemicals to Syria. At issue is the supply of raw materials for painkillers by Brenntag's Swiss-based subsidiary to the Syrian company MPI. Suspicions persist that the substances are used to manufacture chemical weapons such as sarin for Syria's usage of chemical weapons. Brenntag repeatedly denied violating EU export restrictions. Duisburg public prosecutor's office closed proceedings against Brenntag in August 2019.

== Literature ==
Kopper, Christopher; Tilly, Stephanie (2024). 150 Jahre Brenntag: von Berlin in die Welt. München: Siedler. ISBN 978-3-8275-0194-3.
