= Italcementi =

Cement company

Italcementi S.p.A.
- Type: Società per azioni
- Industry: Building materials
- Founded: 1864; 162 years ago
- Defunct: 2023
- Fate: Italcementi was formally rebranded as Heidelberg Materials Italia Cementi S.p.A.
- Headquarters: Bergamo, Italy
- Products: Cement; Construction aggregate; Ready-mix concrete
- Parent: Heidelberg Materials
- Website: www.heidelbergmaterials.it

Former Corporate logo

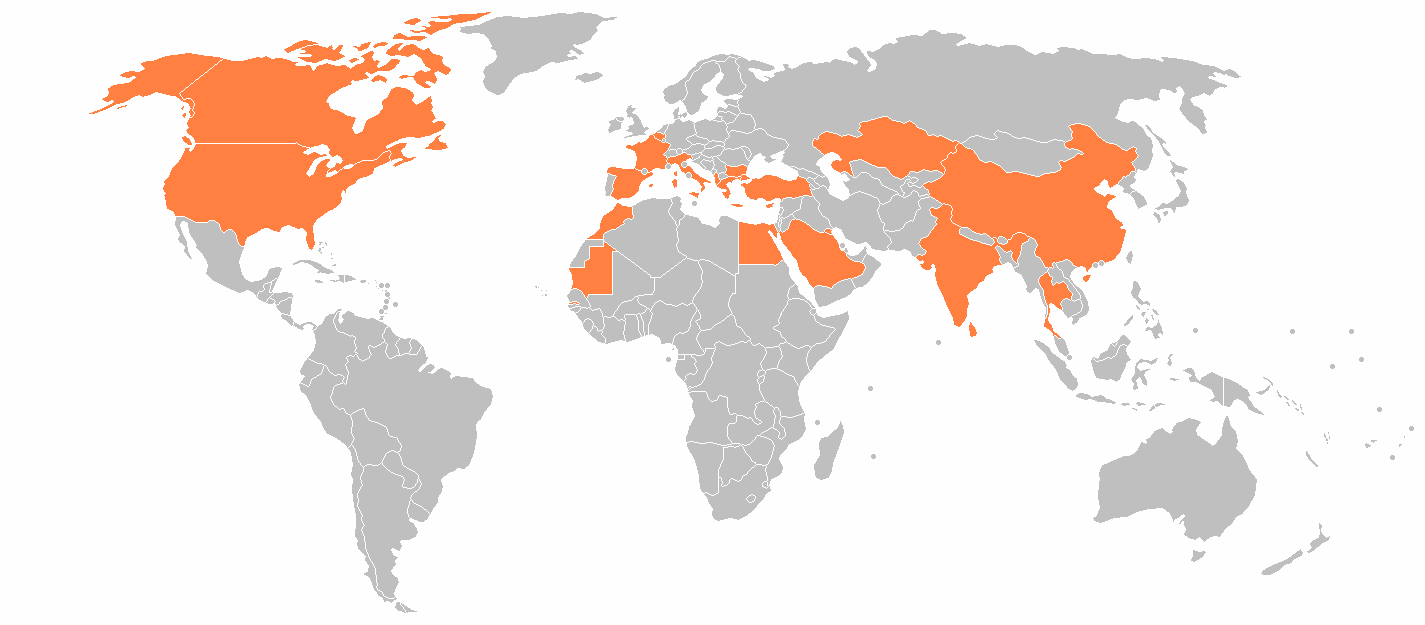
World locations of Italcementi Group

Italcementi was an Italian multinational company producing cement, ready-mix concrete and construction aggregates, founded in 1864 in Bergamo. With an annual cement production capacity of more than 60 million tonnes, it was the world’s fifth-largest cement producer.

The company was listed on the Borsa Italiana until 2016, when it became part of the German group HeidelbergCement (later renamed Heidelberg Materials) following the acquisition of a majority stake. Together, the two companies formed the world’s second-largest cement producer.

In November 2023, the Italcementi brand was discontinued as part of the group’s global rebranding, and its activities in Italy continued under the name Heidelberg Materials Italy.

== History ==
Italcementi was founded in 1846 in Scanzo near Bergamo, Italy, as the Società Bergamasca per la fabbricazione del cemento e della calce idraulica (Bergamo Company for the production of cement and hydraulic lime). The company produced a new grade of cement, the Scanzo cement, that grew in popularity and was used in various projects such as the 16-arches bridge above the Adda river, the Venezia Santa Lucia railway station and the Suez Canal (underwater concrete).

In the early 1920s, the company merged with the construction group owned by the Pesenti family, forming a 12-plant and 1500-employee group producing +200 tons of cement annually. In 1925, it was introduced on the Italian stock exchange. The company became Italcementi in 1927. In the fifties, Italcementi provided the cement for the construction of the Pirelli Tower.

In 1992, it underwent internationalisation following the acquisition of Ciments Français, which made it the largest cement producer of the world. Since 1998, it has further expanded through acquisitions of new cement works in Bulgaria, Kazakhstan, Thailand, Morocco, India, Egypt, Kuwait, and the United States.

In 2010, Ciments français bought its obligations back from its US creditors to pave the way for a merger with its parent company Italcementi, merger that had previously faced a strong opposition from the aforementioned US stakeholders. In June 2014, Italcementi, already an 83% shareholder in Ciments français, launched a bid to buy the remaining 17%. By the end of the takeover bid in July 2014, Italcementi reached 97,73% participation in Ciments français, and remained confident it would reach the 100% threshold.

During the World Expo in Shanghai in 2010, Italcementi introduced the first transparent cement (trademarked as i.light) using thermoplastic polymer resin inserted in the special cement mixture. In 2007, Italcementi introduced a new cement that retains smog with enhanced titanium dioxyde. In 2015, Italcementi introduced a smog-purifying biodynamic cement with photocatalytic properties: it converts polluants contained in the outside air into inert salts.

In July 2015, German construction group HeidelbergCement (world’s 4th cement producer), agreed to buy a 45% stake in Italcementi (world’s 5th cement producer) for $1.85 billion from the Pesenti family (through the family's holding group, Italmobiliare), thus creating the world's 2nd largest cement producer. As a trade-off, the Pesenti family gets 5% of the newly formed group, making them the second largest shareholders after the Merckle family In May 2016, the European commission approved the deal. The acquisition led to 400 lay-offs of Italcementi employees in Italy. The deal was announced a week after Lafarge merged with Holcim, and amid rumors that Dangote Cement was eyeing an acquisition of Italcementi.

On 12 October 2016, HeidelbergCement purchased the remaining Italcementi shares. As a result, HeidelbergCement became the sole shareholder of Italcementi, owning 100% of its share capital.

In January 2018, Italcementi acquired the Italian assets of Cementir Italia and its subsidiaries CementirSacci and Betontir, which were integrated into its industrial structure, expanding production capacity and its presence on the domestic market.

In July 2018, CementirSacci was renamed Italsacci and Cementir Italia became Cemitaly. In 2019, a reorganisation of the Italian industrial network followed, resulting in a structure consisting of 10 cement plants, 4 grinding centres, more than 120 ready-mix concrete plants and several aggregate quarries.

On 9 November 2023, following the global rebranding of the HeidelbergCement Group as Heidelberg Materials, the Italcementi brand was formally replaced by Heidelberg Materials Italy. The Italcementi name continues to be used as a product brand on cement bags. Following the rebranding, the headquarters of the Italian subsidiaries were relocated from Bergamo to Peschiera Borromeo (Milan).

== Activity (historical) ==
Prior to its acquisition by HeidelbergCement in 2016, the Italcementi Group was headquartered in Bergamo, northern Italy. At that time, the group employed more than 20,000 people worldwide, including around 400 staff engaged in technical support and research activities through the group company C.T.G. S.p.A. (Centro Tecnico di Gruppo). Italcementi’s annual revenues exceeded €6 billion.

Before the acquisition, Italcementi operated in 22 countries across Europe, Asia, Africa and North America: Albania, Belgium, Bulgaria, China, Canada, Cyprus, Egypt, France, Gambia, Greece, India, Italy, Kazakhstan, Kuwait, Morocco, Mauritania, Saudi Arabia, Spain, Sri Lanka, Thailand, Turkey and the United States.

More than 60% of the group’s revenues derived from cement production, complemented by ready-mix concrete and aggregates. At the time, the group’s industrial network included 62 cement plants, 12 grinding centers, 4 terminals, 570 ready-mix concrete batching plants and 152 aggregate quarries.

== See also ==
- List of Italian companies
