= Aleksin =

Town in Tula Oblast, Russia

Aleksin Алексин
- Town
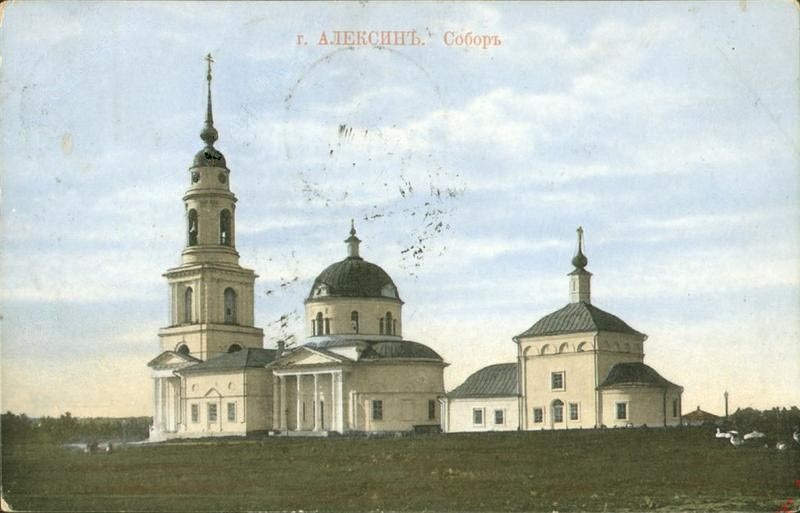

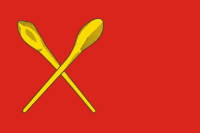
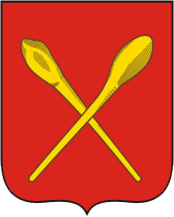
- Flag Coat of arms
- Interactive map of Aleksin
- Location of Aleksin Aleksin (Tula Oblast)
- Coordinates: 54°31′N 37°06′E
- Country: Russia
- Federal subject: Tula Oblast
- Administrative district: Aleksinsky District
- Town under district jurisdictionSelsoviet: Aleksin
- Founded: the end of the 13th century
- Town status since: 1777

Government
  - Head: Andrey Sadovnikov
- Elevation: 160 m (520 ft)

Population (2010 Census)
  - Total: 61,732
  - Estimate (2025): 58,220 (−5.7%)
  - Rank: 261st in 2010

Administrative status
  - Capital of: Aleksinsky District

Municipal status
  - Urban okrug: Aleksin Urban Okrug
  - Capital of: Aleksin Urban Okrug
- Time zone: UTC+3 (MSK)
- Postal codes: 301360–301365, 301367–301371, 301379
- Dialing code: +7 48753
- OKTMO ID: 70706000001

Aleksin (Russian: Але́ксин) is a town and the administrative center of Aleksinsky District in Tula Oblast, Russia, located 71 kilometers (44 mi) northwest of Tula, the administrative center of the oblast. Population: 57,102 (2021 census); 61,732 (2010 census); 68,156 (2002 census); 74,274 (1989 Soviet census).

== History ==
It was founded at the end of the 13th century and first mentioned in 1348 in the Nikon Chronicle. Aleksin was sacked by Khan Akhmat in 1472 during his invasion of the Grand Duchy of Moscow. Because of its location on the Oka River, it was, for a while, an important inland port. Aleksin was granted town status in 1777.

The town expanded in the 1930s with the construction of a chemical plant.

During World War II, Aleksin was under German occupation from 29 November 1941 until 17 December 1941.

== Administrative and municipal status ==
Within the framework of administrative divisions, Aleksin serves as the administrative center of Aleksinsky District and is incorporated within it as a town under district jurisdiction. As a municipal division, the town of Aleksin, together with 154 rural localities in Aleksinsky District, is incorporated as Aleksin Urban Okrug.

== Twin towns – sister cities ==
Aleksin is twinned with:

- Saky, Ukraine
- Salihorsk, Belarus
- Tivat, Montenegro
- Veľký Krtíš, Slovakia
- Yevpatoria, Ukraine

=== Partner cities ===
- Yelabuga, Russia
- Dimitrovgrad, Russia
- Dzerzhinsky, Russia
- Maloyaroslavets, Russia
- Syzran, Russia
- Susaninsky District, Russia
- Chusovoy, Russia
- Serpukhov, Russia
