= VDAX =

The VDAX-NEW Index expresses the variation margin – the implied volatility – of the DAX anticipated on the derivatives market. The VDAX indicates in percentage points the volatility to be expected in the next 30 days for the DAX. The basis for the calculation of this index is provided by the DAX option contracts. It is analogous to the VIX implied volatility index on the S&P 500.

== See also ==
- DAX
- MDAX
- SDAX
- TecDAX
