= Odeon Film =

German film production company

Odeon Film AG
- Founded: April 12, 1999; 27 years ago
- Headquarters: Munich, Germany
- Parent: Leonine Holding

Odeon Film was a film production company based in Munich, Germany.

Since 12 April 1999 Odeon Film AG is listed at the stock exchange. It is member of the CDAX.

== History ==
In April 2006, Bavaria Film announced that they had sold a majority stake of Odeon Film to German private media fund named GFP Medienfonds.

In March 2007, Odeon Film announced that they've acquired Munich-based independent film and television production company Hofmann & Voges.

In July 2011, German mini-major production and distribution company Tele München Group announced that they've acquired a 33% majority stake in Odeon Film thrust expanding Tele München Group's film and television production activities and became Odeon Film's biggest shareholder. Six year later on January 18 2017, Tele München Group announced that they've decided to take full control of Munich-based film & television production company Odeon Film by acquiring 50% stake in Odeon Film.

In March 2022, Odeon Fiction's parent media production & distribution company Leonine Holding (which was rebranded from Tele München Group) announced the restructuring of the former Odeon Film unscripted television production subsidiary Odeon Entertainment and had it rebranded as Madame Zheng Production with the renamed production studio hired former RedSeven Entertainment producer & executive producer Tina Wagner and former co-header of entertainment at Odeon Fiction's parent company Leonine Studios Nina Etspüler as their managing directors of the rebranded production company.

== Subsidiaries ==
The subsidiary Monaco Film mostly produces crime series.

== Films ==
=== TV series ===
==== Still running ====
- Ein Fall für zwei (since 1981)
- Der Landarzt (since 1987, novafilm)
- Der Kriminalist (since 2006, Monaco Film)
- Der Staatsanwalt (since 2007)
- Die Stein (since 2008)
- Letzte Spur Berlin (since 2012, novafilm)
- Familie Undercover (since 2012)

==== Former ====
- Liebling Kreuzberg (novafilm)
- Unser Lehrer Doktor Specht (novafilm)
- Der letzte Zeuge (novafilm)
- KDD – Kriminaldauerdienst
- Türkisch für Anfänger
