= HDAX =

Stock market index

The HDAX is a German stock market index calculated by Deutsche Börse. It consists of all member companies of the DAX, MDAX, and TecDAX, and is a successor to the DAX 100 index.

== See also ==
- DAX
- MDAX
- SDAX
- TecDAX
