= Aleksinsky (rural locality) =

Aleksinsky (Russian: Алексинский; masculine), Aleksinskaya (Алексинская; feminine), or Aleksinskoye (Алексинское; neuter) is the name of several rural localities in Arkhangelsk Oblast, Russia:

- Aleksinskaya, Kargopolsky District, Arkhangelsk Oblast, a village in Tikhmangsky Selsoviet of Kargopolsky District
- Aleksinskaya, Velsky District, Arkhangelsk Oblast, a village in Khozminsky Selsoviet of Velsky District
