= Novogurovsky =

Novogurovsky Новогуровский
- Work settlement
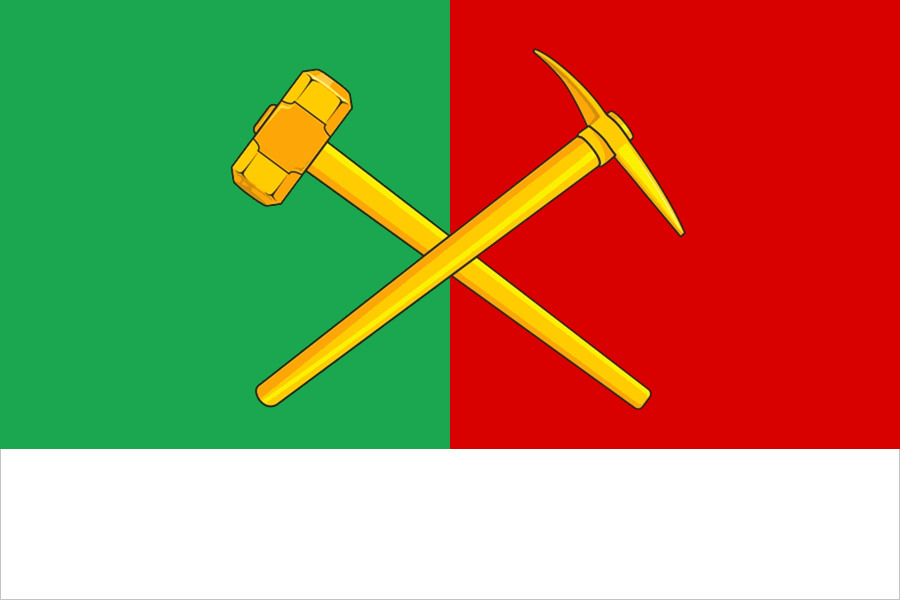
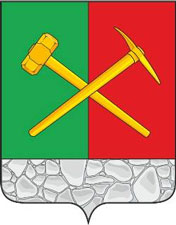
- Flag Coat of arms
- Interactive map of Novogurovsky
- Location of Novogurovsky Novogurovsky (Tula Oblast)
- Coordinates: 54°28′N 37°20′E
- Country: Russia
- Federal subject: Tula Oblast
- Administrative district: Aleksinsky District
- Founded: 1946

Population (2010 Census)
  - Total: 3,590
  - Estimate (2021): 3,634 (+1.2%)

Municipal status
  - Urban okrug: Novogurovsky Urban Okrug
  - Capital of: Novogurovsky Urban Okrug
- Time zone: UTC+3 (MSK)
- Postal code: 301382
- OKTMO ID: 70702000051
- Website: novogurovskiy.tulobl.ru

Novogurovsky (Russian: Новогуровский) is an urban locality (a work settlement) in Aleksinsky District of Tula Oblast, Russia. Population: 3,590 (2010 census); 3,809 (2002 census); 4,491 (1989 Soviet census).

== Administrative and municipal status ==
Within the framework of administrative divisions, Novogurovsky is incorporated within Aleksinsky District as an urban-type settlement. As a municipal division, the work settlement of Novogurovsky is incorporated as Novogurovsky Urban Okrug.
