= Aleksinsky District =

Aleksinsky District Алексинский район (Russian)
- District
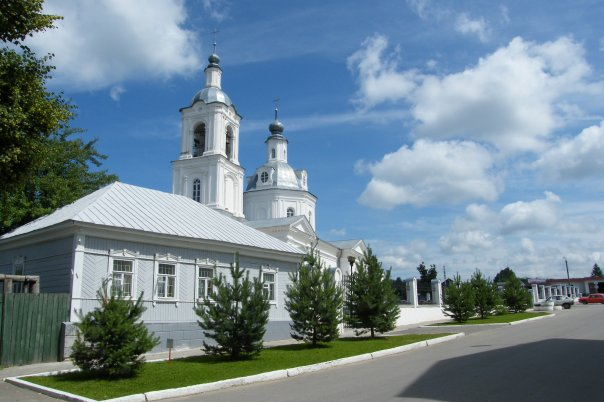
- Church of St. Nicholas, Aleksinsky District

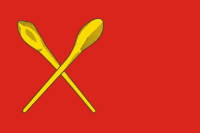
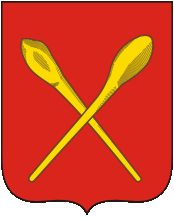
- Flag Coat of arms
- Location of Aleksinsky District in Tula Oblast
- Coordinates: 54°30′N 37°04′E
- Country: Russia
- Federal subject: Tula Oblast
- Established: 15 August 1924
- Administrative center: Aleksin

Area
  - Total: 982.5 km^{2} (379.3 sq mi)

Population (2010 Census)
  - Total: 74,326
  - Density: 75.65/km^{2} (195.9/sq mi)
  - Urban: 87.9%
  - Rural: 12.1%

Administrative structure
  - Administrative divisions: 1 Towns under district jurisdiction, 1 Urban-type settlements, 13 Rural okrugs
  - Inhabited localities: 1 cities/towns, 1 urban-type settlements, 154 rural localities

Municipal structure
  - Municipally incorporated as: Aleksin Urban Okrug
- Website: http://www.aleksin.tula.ru/

Aleksinsky District (Russian: Але́ксинский райо́н) is an administrative district (raion), one of the twenty-three in Tula Oblast, Russia. It is located in the northwest of the oblast. The area of the district is 982.5 square kilometers (379.3 sq mi). Its administrative center is the town of Aleksin. Population: 74,326 (2010 Census); 13,350 (2002 census); 14,727 (1989 Soviet census). The population of Aleksin accounts for 83.1% of the district's total population.

== History ==
On the night of 8–9 November 2024, during the Russo-Ukrainian War, Ukraine launched a drone attack on the Aleksin Chemical Plant—part of the state corporation Rostec—in the Aleksinsky District, about 190 km (120 mi) south of Moscow, causing a series of explosions and fires at the plant which manufactures ammunition and explosives for the Russian military. Russian sources did not acknowledge the attack's success, "as is common following a reported attack by Ukraine on one of [Russia's] military sites."

== Administrative and municipal status ==
Within the framework of administrative divisions, Aleksinsky District is one of the twenty-three in the oblast. The town of Aleksin serves as its administrative center.

As a municipal division, the territory of the district is split between two municipal formations—Aleksin Urban Okrug, to which the town of Aleksin and 154 of the administrative district's rural localities belong, and Novogurovsky Urban Okrug, which covers the rest of the administrative district's territory, including the work settlement of Novogurovsky.
