= Marquard & Bahls =

German oil company

- Trade name: Marquard & Bahls AG
- Type: Aktiengesellschaft
- Industry: Energy supply, Energy Trading, Energy Logistics, Chemicals
- Founded: 1947 in Hamburg
- Founder: Theodor Weisser
- Headquarters: Hamburg, Germany
- Key people: Christoph Witte (CEO)
- Revenue: €15bn (2023)
- Number of employees: 2,784 (2022)
- Website: www.mbholding.com

Marquard & Bahls is a Hamburg-based company active in the fields of energy and chemicals. Its core business includes tank storage logistics and energy commodities trading. Marquard & Bahls was founded in 1947 and has been a stock corporation under commercial law since 1992. The Group has a presence in over 30 countries around the world. In 2023, the company generated revenue of €15 billion. Marquard & Bahls employs 2,784 people.

== History ==
=== 1940s to 1960s ===
Theodor Weisser established the business in 1947 by purchasing Marquard & Bahls, a company that had traded in cereals and lubricants since its founding in 1913. At the time of the takeover, the company existed only as a shell. Founding a new company had not been possible for Weisser at the time, as the British occupying forces did not permit the founding of new companies in the energy sector.

Weisser began trading in heating oil and lubricants, and gradually expanded the business activities in the following years. In the mid-1950s, the company also entered the tank storage business, and in the 1960s focused particularly on expanding its activities abroad. Its trading subsidiary Mabanaft played an important role in developing the spot market in Rotterdam.

=== 1970s to 1990s ===
In 1971, Weisser's eldest son Hans took over the management. In the following year, Marquard & Bahls' tank storage facilities were consolidated into the subsidiary Oiltanking.

After purchasing 25.1% of Stumm AG shares from a shareholder pool consisting of family members and shares from the Otto-Wolff Group in 1974, Marquard & Bahls acquired all shares of Stumm in 1977. Marquard & Bahls converted the public limited company back into a GmbH and acted as a holding company.

In January 1987, Stumm GmbH was renamed Marquard & Bahls GmbH. In the 1990s, a new service-station organization was established, which has since started operating under the brand Oil!. Beyond this, the company had been active in the sale of heating oil to end-consumers since the 1980s; these activities were bundled under the Petronord umbrella in 1996.

In 1999, Marquard & Bahls entered the aviation fuelling business, and further expanded this line of business, which operated as Skytanking, in the following years.

=== 2000s and 2010s ===
Since 2002, Marquard & Bahls has been active in the field of renewable energies and invested in a wood-fired power plant. As a by-product of the plant, wood pellets were produced, which were sold by GEE Energy, a subsidiary of Marquard & Bahls.

Among the activities in the field of renewable energy was, in addition to the trading of biofuels, which was part of Mabanaft until 2018, also biogas. The Mabagas subsidiary realized biogas projects based on organic waste from 2008 to 2018.

In 2008 and 2011, Marquard & Bahls acquired shares in Newsco International Energy Services companies through its subsidiary Oiltanking. By 2014, Marquard & Bahls had increased its holdings to secure a majority stake in Newsco. However, in March 2017, Marquard & Bahls decided to sell all of these shares again.

In May 2012, Oiltanking acquired United Bulk Terminals in the US. This division had been directly allocated to Marquard & Bahls since the end of 2014 until September 2019, when Marquard & Bahls sold United Bulk Terminals.

In August 2019, Marquard & Bahls also sold its stake in Natgas AG, Potsdam, to the former co-shareholder Friedrich Scharr KG, Stuttgart. To expand further into the renewable energy & chemical sector, Marquard & Bahls invested in the Norwegian company Nordic Blue Crude in December 2019.

=== The 2020s ===
In May 2021, an investment was made in the Swiss company Brusa ICS. In February 2022, Marquard & Bahls acquired additional shares in the company. At the end of 2021, in the context of the COVID-19 pandemic, the subsidiary Skytanking was sold.

In February 2022, Oiltanking and Mabanaft were targeted by cyberattacks. The attacks lasted for several weeks and prompted prosecutorial investigations into the offence of extortion.

== Business Areas ==
Marquard & Bahls is organized as a holding company and operates through its subsidiaries in several business areas:

=== MB Energy (before: Mabanaft) ===
MB Energy is the trading division of Marquard & Bahls. It is active in regional trading and wholesaling of petroleum products. The company also operates in the bunkering, service-station and heating oil retail businesses, as well as trading in liquid gas and biofuels. The group consists of more than 100 companies and its annual volume of sales is approximately 12 million tons (as of: 2024). MB Energy sold its shares in the more than 340 Oil! service stations to the British Prax Group in 2023. The transaction, announced in October 2023, was completed in early December 2023.

=== Oiltanking ===
Oiltanking is one of the largest independent tank storage providers for petroleum products, chemicals and gases worldwide. Customers include private and state-owned oil companies, refineries, petrochemical companies, as well as traders of petroleum products and chemicals. In May 2022, a new subsidiary of Oiltanking called Advario was established. Headquartered in Rotterdam, Advario operates 13 tank terminals in Europe, China, Singapore, the Middle East, and the United States. The company owns and operates 45 terminals in 20 countries with a total capacity of 18.5 million cubic metres (as of: May 2022). The total throughput of all tank terminals in 2019 was about 155 million tons. Advario focuses on the areas of petrochemicals, gases, and renewable energies, with an emphasis on sustainable processes and plans to reach net zero operations by 2040.

== Management and governance ==
Since July 2022, Christoph Witte has been CEO of the company, which is not listed on the stock exchange. Hellmuth Weisser was chairman of the supervisory board from 2003 to February 2017. His successor is Daniel Weisser.
