= Lekkerland =

German wholesale company

Lekkerland SE & Co. KG
- Type: SE & Co. KG
- Industry: Wholesale, logistics
- Founded: 11 August 1960
- Headquarters: Frechen, Germany
- Key people: Patrick Steppe
- Revenue: €15.3 billion (2025)
- Number of employees: 5,900 (2025)
- Parent: REWE Group
- Website: www.lekkerland.com

Lekkerland SE & Co. KG is a German wholesale and logistics company that supplies food, beverages, tobacco products, telecommunications products and non-food articles. Its main customers include service-station shops, kiosks, convenience stores, charging stations and quick-service restaurants. The company is headquartered in Frechen, North Rhine-Westphalia. In 2025, Lekkerland supplied around 62,000 sales points in Europe, employed about 5,900 people and generated revenue of around €15.3 billion.

== History ==
Several independent confectionery wholesalers joined forces in the Netherlands in 1956. They named their company Lekkerland—the Dutch word “lekker” means delicious, sweet, or delightful.

Lekkerland Deutschland was founded on 11 August 1960 by the companies Veil & Sohn of Frankenthal, Gebr. Pütz oHG of Cologne, Heinrich Winkels of Söthe in Mettmann, Ludwig Zeus oHG of Elz, Wilhelm Kohleisen of Mögglingen, Hermann Zeus KG of Großauheim, Karl Limbach of Eitorf an der Sieg, Friedrich Linne of Düsseldorf, Paul Kaiser of Remscheid and August Kratz of Illingen. Werner Veil became the first managing director. In the following years, further wholesale companies joined the Lekkerland association.

Food wholesalers operating under the Lekkerland name were also established in other European countries, beginning with Belgium and Luxembourg in 1975. Lekkerland Europa Holding GmbH was founded in 1989, followed by Lekkerland International GmbH in 1991.

The German Lekkerland wholesalers were initially grouped into district centres and, in 1991, into five legally independent regional centres. In 1996 Lekkerland merged with the competing wholesale group Sügro. In 1998 the company acquired ESTE, a subsidiary of the oil company Shell.

On 1 January 1999, Lekkerland GmbH & Co. KG merged with Tobaccoland Großhandelsgesellschaft mbH & Co. KG to form Lekkerland-Tobaccoland GmbH & Co. KG. The vending-machine business was transferred to the newly established Tobaccoland Automatengesellschaft mbH & Co. KG, which remained majority-owned by Austria Tabak AG. A key initiator of the merger was the then Lekkerland managing director Wolfgang Zinn, who subsequently headed both companies.

At the beginning of 2005, the company name was changed from Lekkerland-Tobaccoland GmbH & Co. KG to Lekkerland GmbH & Co. KG. In 2007 the German business was separated from the group holding company. The holding company changed its legal form and name to Lekkerland AG & Co. KG, while the operating German business was transferred to Lekkerland Deutschland GmbH & Co. KG.

In December 2015, Lekkerland (Schweiz) AG acquired Contadis AG, the wholesale division of the Swiss tobacco group Oettinger Davidoff Group; the transaction was completed in early 2016.

On 28 May 2019, the Cologne-based REWE Group announced that it intended to acquire Lekkerland in full in order to strengthen its convenience-food business. The German Federal Cartel Office cleared the acquisition on 9 October 2019.

Lekkerland (Schweiz) AG was dissolved by resolution of its general meeting on 2 July 2020. The company subsequently entered liquidation. In September 2021 it was reported that Saviva planned to move its headquarters into the former Lekkerland building in Brunegg.

== Corporate structure ==
Since 9 October 2019, Lekkerland SE & Co. KG, based in Frechen, has been wholly owned by Rewe-Zentralfinanz eG in Cologne. Lekkerland Austria, based in Ternitz, was not acquired by REWE as part of the transaction after the Austrian Federal Competition Authority raised concerns about the takeover. In January 2022 it was announced that Lekkerland Austria would be acquired by the retailer Unik.

Before its acquisition by REWE, Lekkerland SE & Co. KG had a dispersed ownership structure. One of its major shareholders was Japan Tobacco International, which held 25.1 percent of the company.

=== Holdings ===
The group has included the following subsidiaries and participations:

- Lekkerland Nederland B.V. — Netherlands, 100%
- Lekkerland Vending Services B.V. — Netherlands, 100%
- Conway – The Convenience Company België N.V. — Belgium, 100%
- Lekkerland Handels- und Dienstleistungs GmbH — Austria, 100%
- Conway – The Convenience Company S.A. — Spain, 70%
- Conway Fixmer S.à.r.l. — Luxembourg, 50%
