= CDAX =

German stock market index

The CDAX is a German stock market index calculated by Deutsche Börse. It is a composite index of all stocks traded on the Frankfurt Stock Exchange that are listed in the General Standard or Prime Standard market segments.

== See also ==
- DAX
- MDAX
- SDAX
- TecDAX
