= Frankfurt Stock Exchange =

12th largest stock exchange by market cap

- Frankfurter Wertpapierbörse

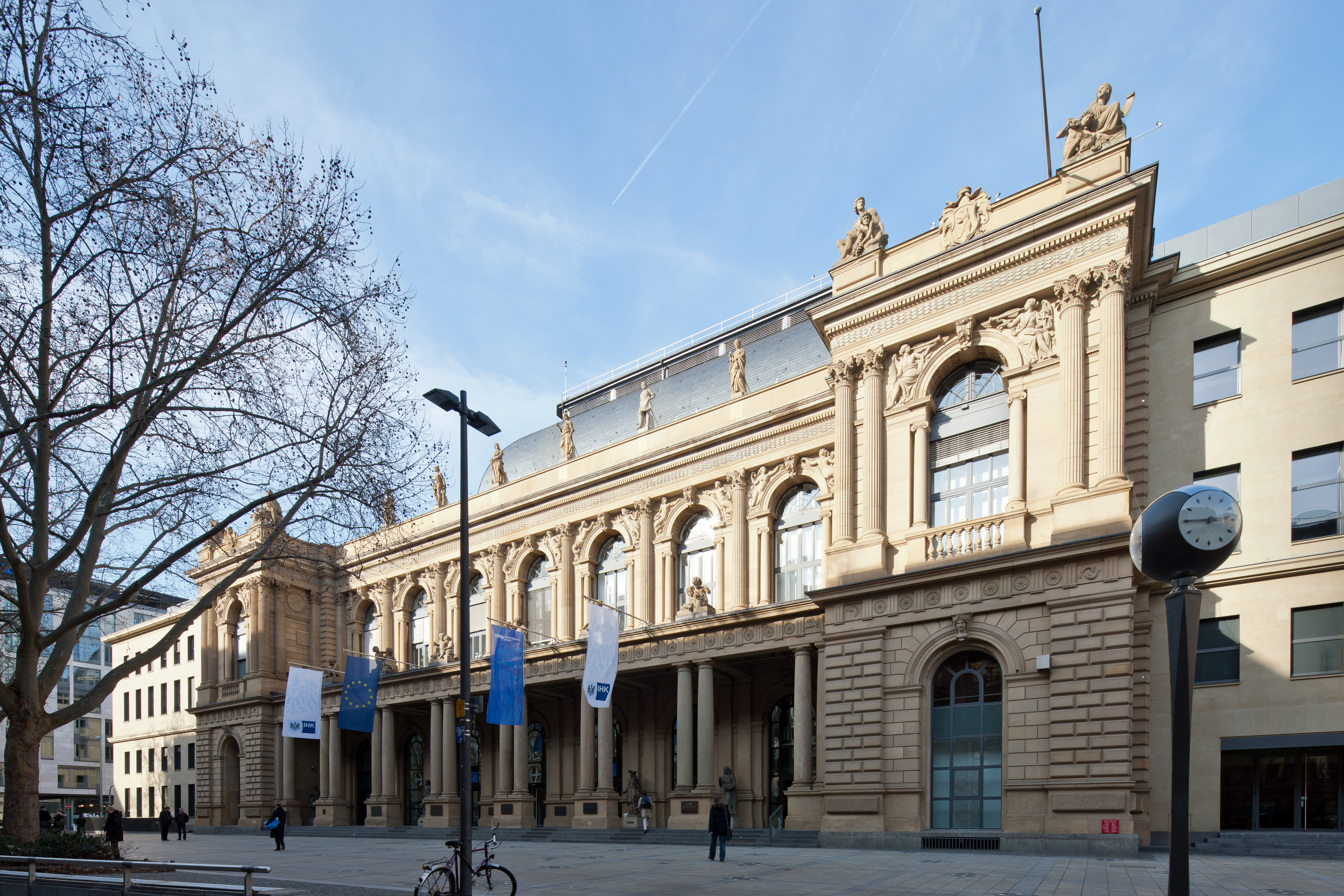
- Type: Stock exchange
- Location: Frankfurt, Hesse, Germany
- Coordinates: 50°06′55″N 8°40′40″E
- Founded: 1585; 441 years ago
- Owner: Deutsche Börse, Börse Frankfurt Zertifikate AG
- Currency: Euro
- Market cap: US$2.37 trillion (March 2023)
- Website: www.boerse-frankfurt.de

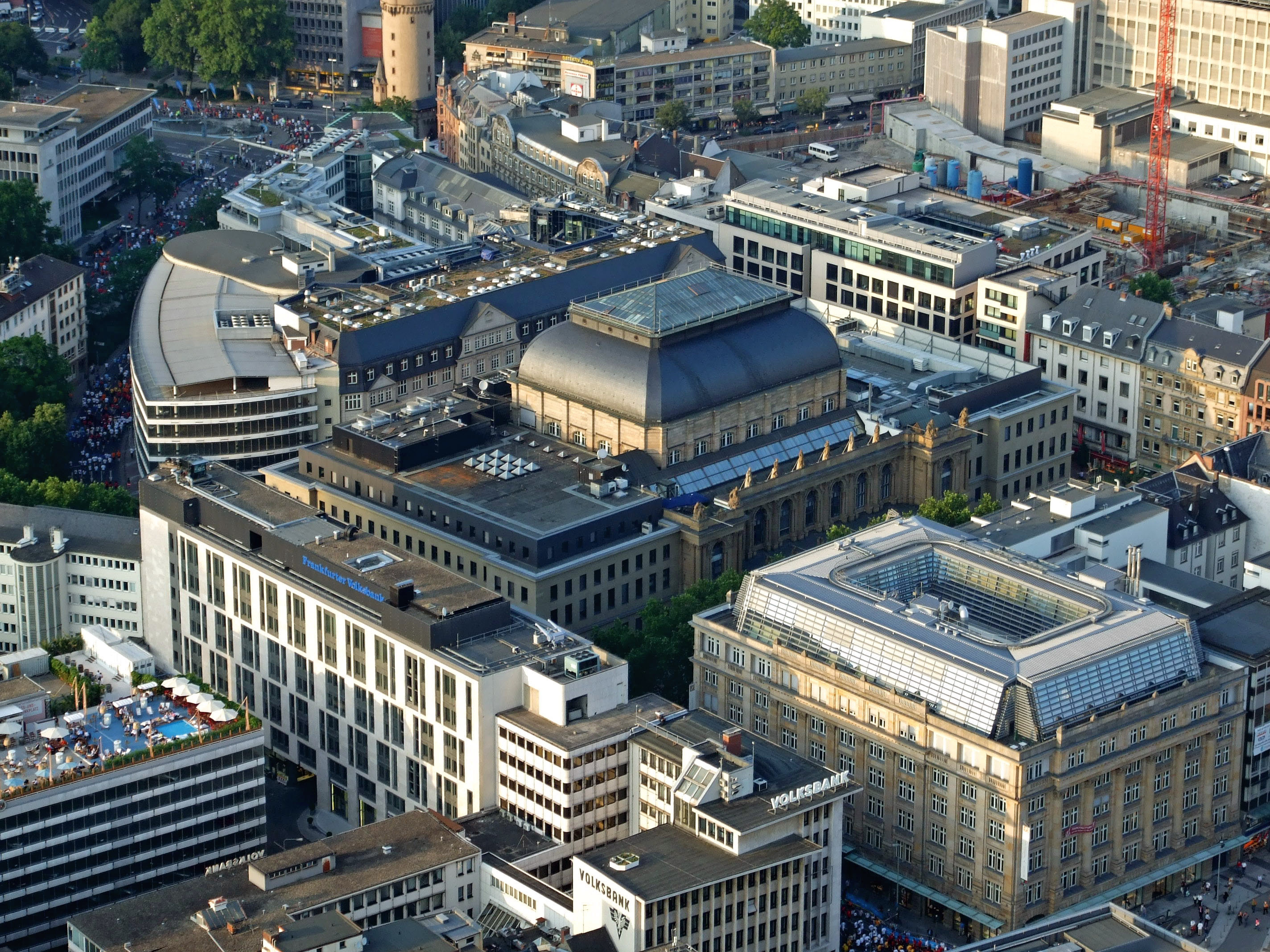
Building in the center of Frankfurt

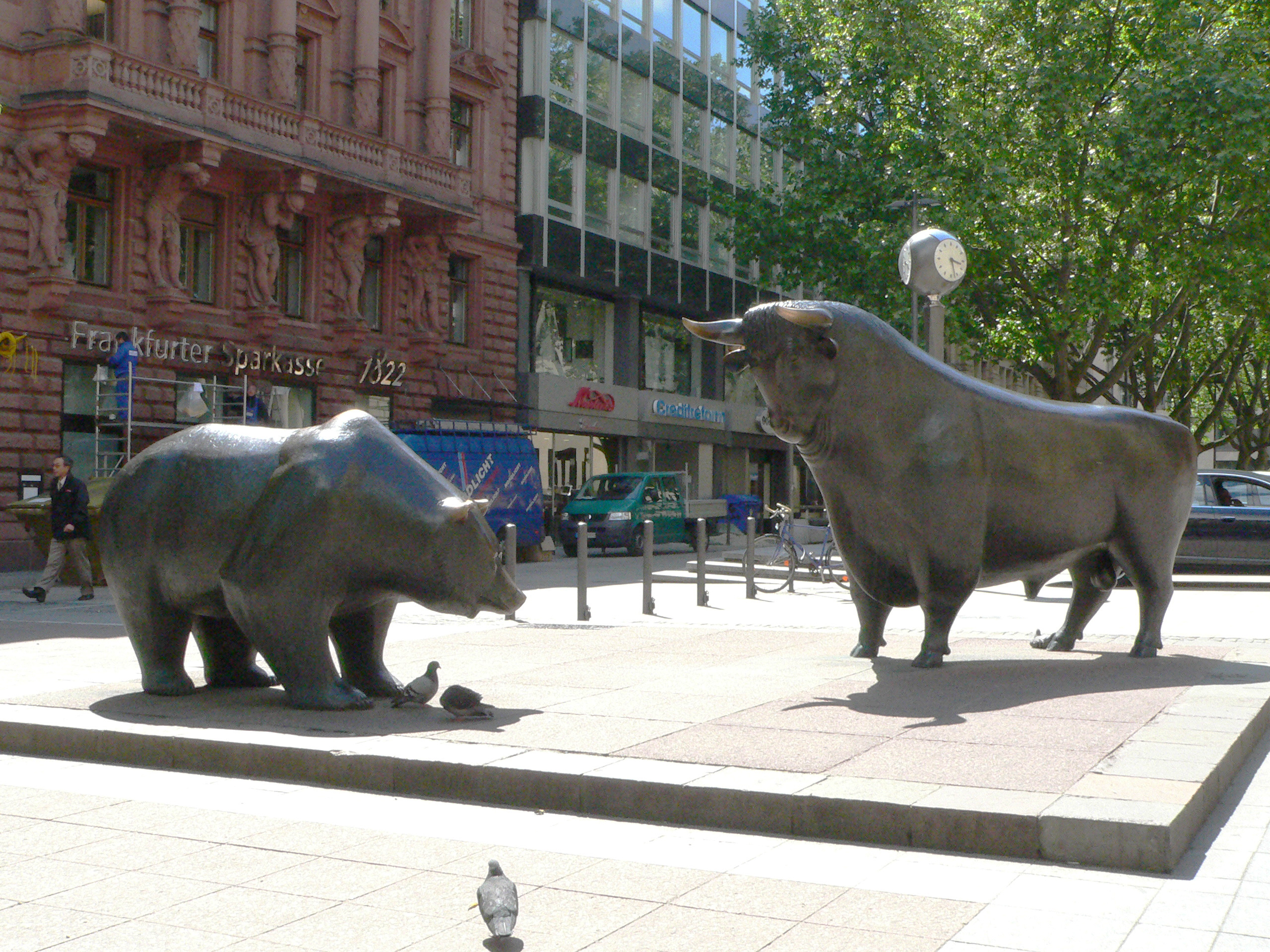
The bear and the bull in front of the Exchange

The Frankfurt Stock Exchange (German: Börse Frankfurt, former German name: Frankfurter Wertpapierbörse, FWB) is the world's 3rd oldest and 12th largest stock exchange by market capitalization. It has operations from 08:00 to 22:00 (German time).

== Organisation ==
Located in Frankfurt, Germany, the Frankfurt Stock Exchange is owned and operated by Deutsche Börse AG and Börse Frankfurt Zertifikate AG. It is located in the district of Innenstadt and within the central business district known as Bankenviertel.

With 90 percent of its turnover generated in Germany, namely at the two trading venues Xetra and Börse Frankfurt, the Frankfurt Stock Exchange is the largest of the seven regional securities exchanges in Germany.

The trading indices are DAX, DAXplus, CDAX, DivDAX, LDAX, MDAX, SDAX, TecDAX, VDAX and EuroStoxx 50.

== Trading venues Xetra and Börse Frankfurt ==
Through its Deutsche Börse Cash Market business section, Deutsche Börse AG now operates two trading venues at the Frankfurt Stock Exchange.

- Xetra is the reference market for exchange trading in German equities and exchange traded funds. In 2015, 90 per cent of all trading in shares at all German exchanges was transacted through the Xetra. With regard to DAX listings, Xetra has 60 per cent market share throughout Europe.^{[1]} Trading times on trading days are from 9.00 a.m. to 5.30 p.m.^{[2]} The prices on Xetra serve as the basis for calculating the DAX, the best-known German share index. Over 200 trading participants from 16 European countries, plus Hong Kong and the United Arab Emirates, are connected via Xetra servers in Frankfurt/Main.^{[3]}
- Börse Frankfurt is the trading venue for mainly private investors with more than one million securities of German and international issuers. So-called "specialists" on the trading floor attend to the trading of the securities.

== Market surveillance and protective mechanisms ==
Trading at the Frankfurt Stock Exchange is governed by clear rules, which apply equally for all trading participants. Independent market surveillance is made up of the Trading Surveillance Office (HÜSt), the Exchange Supervisory Authority attached to the Hessian Ministry of Economic Affairs, Transportation, and Regional Development, and the Federal Financial Supervisory Authority (BaFin).

With a view to improving the continuity of prices and to avoid mistrades, several protective mechanisms are in place for the trading venues Xetra and Börse Frankfurt. These include volatility interruption, market order interruption, and liquidity interruption measures.

== History ==
The origins of the Frankfurt Stock Exchange go back to medieval trade fairs in the 11th century. By the 16th century Frankfurt developed into a wealthy and busy city with an economy based on trade and financial services.

In 1585 a bourse was established to set up fixed currency exchange rates, which is considered to mark the 'birth' of the stock exchange. In the following centuries Frankfurt developed into one of the world's first stock exchanges – next to Amsterdam, London and Paris. Bankers like Mayer Amschel Rothschild and Max Warburg had substantial influence on Frankfurt's financial trade.

In 1879, the Frankfurt Stock Exchange moved into its new building at Börsenplatz. During the final third of the 19th century, Frankfurt was a major financial center in the Atlantic world.

It was only in 1949 after World War II that the Frankfurt Stock Exchange finally established as the leading stock exchange in Germany with consequently incoming national and international investments.

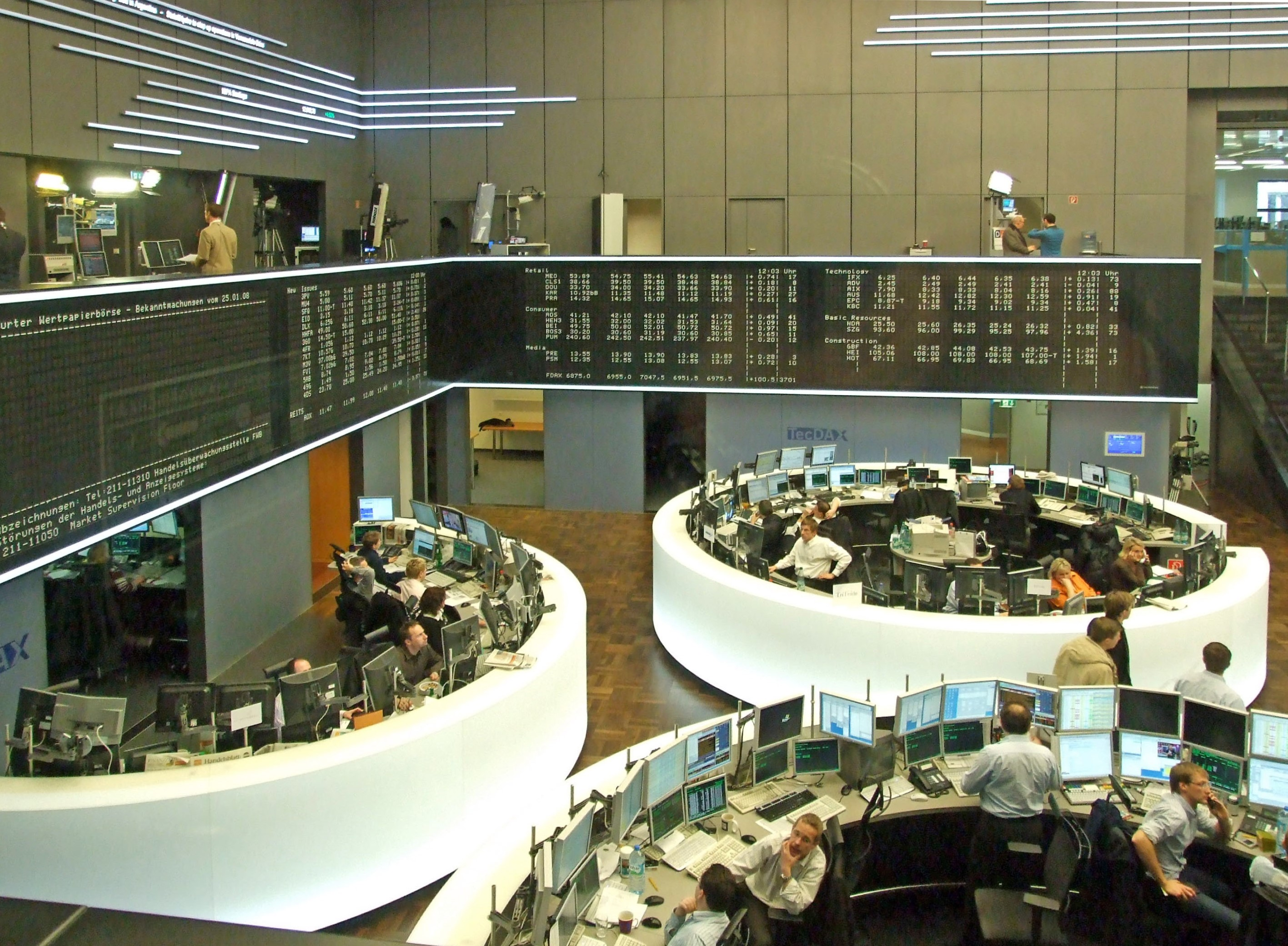
Frankfurt Stock Exchange floor

During the 1990s the Frankfurt Stock Exchange was also bourse for the Neuer Markt (New Market) as part of the worldwide dot-com boom.

In 1993 the Frankfurter Wertpapierbörse (Frankfurt Stock Exchange) became Deutsche Börse AG, operating businesses for the exchange.

From the early 1960s onwards the Frankfurt Stock Exchange took advantage of the close by Bundesbank which effectively decided on financial policies in Europe until the introduction of the euro in 2002. Since then the exchange profits from the presence of the European Central Bank in Frankfurt.

In 2002 and 2004 Deutsche Börse was in advanced negotiations to take over London Stock Exchange, which were broken off in 2005. A further merger bid was blocked by the European Commission in 2017.
