= VEM =

Vem or VEM may refer to:

- Vem, a Brazilian ticketing system
- Vem (given name)
- Vem (album), a 1999 album by Grönwalls
- VEM Aktienbank, a German bank
- Variable entrant map, a variant of Karnaugh maps in logic optimization
- Venus Emissivity Mapper, a multispectral imaging instrument

== See also ==
- VEMS, a supplier of computer components
