= ÖkoDAX =

- Foundation: 4 June 2007
- Operator: STOXX (Qontigo, Deutsche Börse)
- Exchanges: Frankfurt Stock Exchange
- Constituents: 10
- Type: Renewable energy
- Weighting method: Capitalization-weighted
- Related indices: DAX, MDAX, SDAX, TecDAX
- Website: ÖkoDAX actual track

ÖkoDAX is a German stock market index which includes ten companies in the renewable energy sector. It was introduced, 4 June 2007. The constituting companies and their weightings are reviewed quarterly (March, June, September and December). The companies should be represented with equal proportions (i.e., 10%). The ÖkoDAX is calculated as a performance index as well as a price index.

== Development ==
The ÖkoDAX is based on Xetra. Its composition and weightings (price index) is shown below:

| Name | 18 Mar 2009 | 5 Jan 2010 | 6 Jul 2012 | Remarks |
|---|---|---|---|---|
| 3W Power | | | 5,91 % | since 18.06.2012 |
| Centrotherm photovoltaics | 10.38 % | 9.68 % | 5.42 % | until 21.09.2012 |
| Crop energy | | 8.58 % | 14.69 % | |
| Nordex AG | 11.78 % | 10.56 % | 9.53 % | since 04.06.2007 |
| Phoenix Solar AG | 15.75 % | 9.57 % | | |
| PNE Wind | | 10.35 % | 13.40 % | since 24.09.2007 |
| Q-Cells SE | 5.68 % | 10.85 % | | |
| REpower Systems AG | 10.22 % | | | |
| Roth & Rau | 12.72 % | 10.13 % | | |
| S.A.G. Solarstrom AG | | | | |
| SFC Energy AG | | | 6.63 % | since 18.06.2012 |
| SMA Solar Technology AG | 10.67 % | 10.12 % | 12.39 % | since 22.09.2008 |
| SolarWorld AG | 11.26 % | 10.22 % | 6.72 % | since 04.06.2007 |
| Vereinigte BioEnergie AG | | | 10.22 % | |

== See also ==
- DAX
- MDAX
- Photovoltaik Global 30 Index
- SDAX
- TecDAX
