= Phoenix Solar =

Energy company of Germany

Phoenix Solar AG
- Company type: Aktiengesellschaft
- Traded as: FWB: PS4
- Industry: Photovoltaics
- Founded: 1999
- Headquarters: Sulzemoos, Germany
- Key people: Oliver Gosemann (Chairman of the supervisory board), Manfred Hochleitner (CFO)
- Products: Photovoltaic systems, solar modules, photovoltaic accessories
- Revenue: €635.7 million (2010)
- Operating income: €36.4 million (2010)
- Net income: €24.2 million (2010)
- Total assets: €313.3 million (end 2010)
- Total equity: €142.4 million (end 2010)
- Number of employees: 310 (average, 2010)
- Website: phoenixsolar-group.com

Phoenix Solar AG was a German solar photovoltaic company involved in the systems integration business. Specifically, the company designs, builds and operates large, utility-scale photovoltaic power plants and a specialist wholesaler of photovoltaic systems, solar modules and related equipment.

== History ==
Phoenix Solar AG emerged from an initiative of the "Bund der Energieverbraucher e.V" (English: "Cooperative of Energy Consumers"), which was originally started in 1994. The company was officially founded on November 18, 1999 and on January 7, 2000 it was entered into the commercial register of companies. At the Annual General Meeting on May 25, 2007, the shareholders approved a change of name from "Phönix SonnenStrom AG" to "Phoenix Solar AG". Phoenix Solar AG has its headquarters at Sulzemoos northwest of Munich, Germany and sales offices in Germany, as well as subsidiaries in Italy, Spain, Greece, Singapore, Oman and Australia and the USA.

Since November 18, 2004, the "Phoenix SonnenAktie" (shares of the company) have been traded on the OTC stock exchanges in Munich, Frankfurt, Berlin / Bremen and Stuttgart. With the start of share trading on the M: access exchange (the segment of the Munich Stock Exchange dedicated to small and mid-cap companies) on July 27, 2005, Phoenix Solar AG gained access to additional capital and a wider investing audience. On June 27, 2006, the shares of Phoenix officially were listed and started trading on the Frankfurt Stock Exchange (Prime Standard). Since June 2007 Phoenix Solar shares were listed in the ÖkoDAX and since March 2008 they are a constituent of the TecDAX stock market index.

In July 2013 the company started building a 38.6-megawatt photovoltaic plant on a former cotton field in Georgia, based on a contract with Silicon Ranch Corporation. In the same month two branches of Phoenix in Oman and Singapore became responsible for the design and construction of a 1.8 MWp solar power plant in Riyadh.

In February 2018, the company started insolvency proceedings.
