= MS3 =

MS3 may refer to:

- Mighty Servant 3, a 27,000-ton semi-submersible heavy-lift ship
- Junior medical student, in the list of medical abbreviations: J
- Metal Slug 3, a video game
- MotorStorm: Apocalypse, the third main video game in the series
- MegaSquirt3, a type of MegaSquirt electronic fuel injection controller

MS-3 may refer to:

- Mississippi's 3rd congressional district
- a type of trams of Putilov plant

MS.3 may refer to:

- Escadrille MS.3, a French air force unit of Escadron de Chasse 01-002 "Cigognes"
- Morane-Saulnier MS.3, a French parasol wing one or two-seat aeroplane of the First World War

MS 3 may refer to:

- Mississippi Highway 3
