= Computec =

German computer media company

Computec Media GmbH
- Type: Subsidiary
- Industry: Computer related media
- Founded: 1989
- Founder: Christian Geltenpoth
- Headquarters: Fürth, Germany
- Key people: Benjamin Sterbenz; Rainer Rosenbusch
- Number of employees: 110 (14 October 2022)
- Parent: Marquard Media Group
- Website: www.computec.de

Computec Media GmbH is a German computer media company headquartered in Fürth. It is a subsidiary of the Swiss Marquard Media Group. The company publishes multiple magazines and websites related to computers, video gaming and media.

== History ==
Computec Media was founded in 1989 by Christian Geltenpoth who led the company until 2005. In 1999, the company tried to establish itself in the United States but had to cancel its operations after only ten months.

From 1998 to 2013, it was traded in the General Standard of the Frankfurt stock exchange. In 2005, the Swiss Marquard Media AG became the company's major stock holder and on 1 October 2013 it bought the remaining stocks via a squeeze-out. Computec Media was delisted and transformed into a GmbH. In 2014 the company bought the Linux- and Raspberry-Pi-related magazines of Medialinx and in 2016 the mobile phone news website Areamobile.de.

Computec Media was the publisher of a number of now-defunct magazines, such as SEGA Magazin, PC Action, Play Time, incite PC Gaming, Amiga Games, Mega Fun and XBG Games.

=== Subsidiaries ===
- Golem Media GmbH Berlin, Germany

== Publications ==
- Buffed
- Games Aktuell
- gamesworld.de
- gamezone.de
- Golem.de
- Linux-Magazin
- LinuxUser
- N-Zone
- PC Games
- PC Games MMORE
- PC Games Hardware
- Play⁵
- Raspberry Pi Geek
- videogameszone.de
