= VEM Aktienbank =

VEM Aktienbank AG
- Company type: public
- Traded as: FWB: VAB
- ISIN: DE0007608309
- Industry: Investment banking
- Founded: 1997
- Headquarters: Munich, Germany
- Key people: Erich Pfaffenberger
- Products: Mergers and acquisitions, initial public offering, rights issue
- Number of employees: 25+
- Website: www.vem-aktienbank.de

VEM Aktienbank was a Munich-based investment bank with a strong focus on corporate actions and designated sponsoring for exchange-listed SMEs. Having transacted over 250 capital increases and listings since its founding in 1997, VEM is a major player in the German IPO and secondary market. Services for overseas companies include dual listings or primary listings (floating or IPO) on all German market segments (Open Market, Entry Standard, General Standard, Prime Standard of Frankfurt Stock Exchange).
