= Centrotherm Photovoltaics =

German company

centrotherm international AG
- Type: Aktiengesellschaft
- Traded as: FWB: CTN
- Industry: Photovoltaics
- Predecessor: centrotherm Elektrische Anlagen GmbH + Co. KG.
- Founded: 1976
- Headquarters: Blaubeuren, Germany
- Key people: Jan von Schuckmann (CEO), Gunter Fauth (COO), Robert M. Hartung(Chairman of the supervisory board)
- Products: Planning and development of photovoltaic production sites; photovoltaic production equipment and turnkey production lines
- Revenue: €149.18 million (January 1-September 30, 2012) €69.18 million (October 1, 2012-May 31, 2013)
- Operating income: ▼€29.7 million (October 1, 2012-May 31, 2013)
- Net income: ▼€77.4 million (October 1, 2012-May 31, 2013)
- Total assets: €377.7 million (October 1, 2012-May 31, 2013)
- Total equity: €49.4 million (October 1, 2012-May 31, 2013)
- Number of employees: 817 (2013)
- Website: www.centrotherm-pv.com

centrotherm international AG is a supplier of process technology and equipment for the photovoltaics, semiconductor and microelectronics industries. Its company headquarters are in Blaubeuren, Germany (Baden-Württemberg).

== Industry sector ==
centrotherm international AG develops, manufactures and markets thermal key equipment and process technology for the production of solar cells, power semiconductor devices, logic and memory devices as well as LED and sensor technologies and also provides related services to customers.

== Company history ==
The company was founded in 1976 as centrotherm Elektrische Anlagen GmbH + Co. KG. In the 1990s the company broke into the photovoltaic business and since 2000 has been an important global player in this industry sector. As part of company restructuring in the centrotherm Group, the name of the photovoltaic business unit was changed to centrotherm photovoltaics solutions GmbH & Co. KG in 2004 and in 2006 became centrotherm photovoltaics AG. The company has been listed on the Prime Standard of the Frankfurt Stock Exchange since October 2007 and was also listed on the German TecDAX in December of the same year.
