= TeamViewer (company) =

German technology company

TeamViewer SE

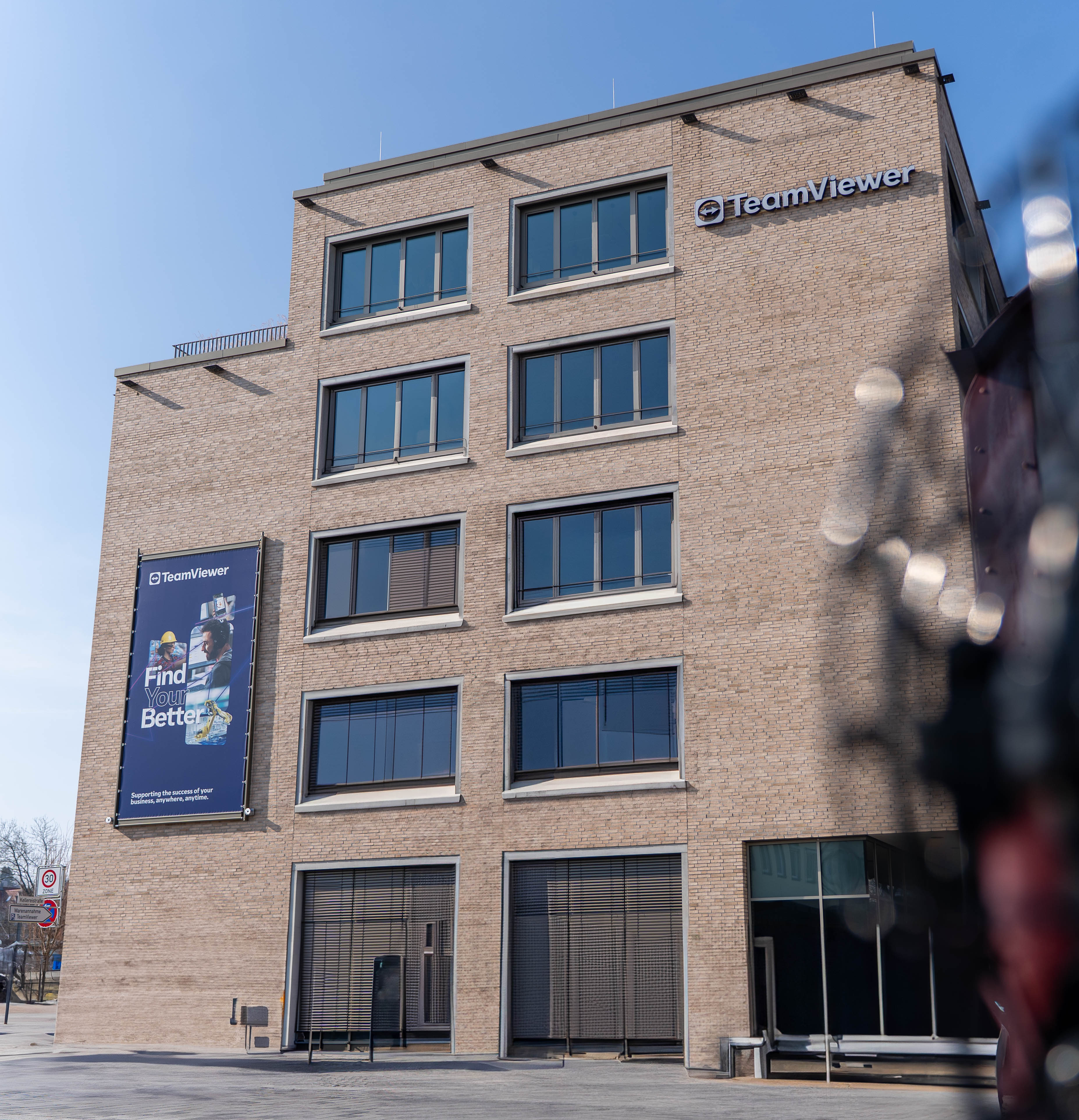
- Headquarters in February 2025
- Type: Public (Societas Europaea)
- Traded as: FWB: TMV; SDAX
- ISIN: DE000A2YN900
- Industry: Software
- Founded: 2005; 21 years ago
- Headquarters: Göppingen, Germany
- Area served: Worldwide
- Key people: Oliver Steil (chief executive officer and chairman of the executive board); Ralf W. Dieter (chairman of the supervisory board)
- Services: Software and computer services
- Revenue: ▲€767.5 million (2025)
- Net income: ▼€118.2 million (2025)
- Total assets: ▲€1,675.8 million (2025)
- Total equity: ▲€164.9 million (2025)
- Number of employees: ▲1,925 (2025)
- Website: www.teamviewer.com/en/

TeamViewer SE is an international technology company headquartered in Göppingen, Germany. The company became known for the TeamViewer remote access and support software of the same name. Within the TeamViewer software, customers can connect, monitor, and control computers, machines, and other devices. It can be used in various industries, for example, to digitalize processes along the industrial value chain. The company is listed on the stock exchange and is a member of SDAX and TecDAX.

== History ==
=== Start-up and growth phase ===
TeamViewer was founded following the release of the first version of the TeamViewer software in 2005. The TeamViewer software was developed to reduce travelling to customers. It became the core product of the newly founded TeamViewer GmbH, which today operates as TeamViewer Germany GmbH and belongs to TeamViewer SE. The company's business model allowed private users to use the software free of charge, while companies had to purchase a license.

In 2010, TeamViewer GmbH was acquired by GFI Software. In 2014, British private equity firm Permira acquired TeamViewer and helped the company develop an international customer base and expand the scope of its products. With a purchase price of around one billion US dollars, the company was classified as a so-called "unicorn", the designation for an unlisted company worth at least one billion US dollars.

=== Initial public offering ===
From the beginning of 2018, the company changed its business model from the previous sale of licenses to subscriptions. This followed a general trend in the IT industry and helped TeamViewer to grow further. In preparation for an IPO, a new corporate structure was created in 2019.

The company was initially listed on the Frankfurt Stock Exchange in September 2019. With an issue volume of €2.2 billion, it was the largest IPO of a German technology company since 2000 and the largest IPO in Europe in 2019. By the end of 2019, TeamViewer's shares had been admitted to the MDAX and TecDAX stock indices.

At the end of 2025, TeamViewer introduced the AI agent Tia, which can independently resolve technical issues.

In March 2026, TeamViewer shares were moved from the MDAX to the SDAX based on its market capitalisation.

== Company ==
TeamViewer SE is a European stock corporation (Societas Europaea). Together with its domestic and foreign subsidiaries, it forms the TeamViewer Group. The most important subsidiaries include TeamViewer Germany GmbH, which is responsible for the operating business.

TeamViewer's shares are traded on the regulated market (Prime Standard) of the Frankfurt Stock Exchange. All shares are in free float. The biggest shareholder is BlackRock.

=== Management ===
The executive board of TeamViewer consists of Oliver Steil (chief executive officer), Michael Wilkens (chief financial officer), Mark Banfield (chief revenue officer) and Mei Dent (chief product officer & chief technology officer). Additionally, there is an extended management board (senior leadership team).

Chairman of the supervisory board is Ralf W. Dieter.

=== Locations ===
TeamViewer's headquarters are located at Bahnhofsplatz in Göppingen. The building had been constructed by the city and was originally intended to be used as an extension of the city hall, before it was offered to the company to keep it in Göppingen.

Internationally, TeamViewer has multiple subsidiaries and locations on all continents. The key locations for research and development are Göppingen, Bremen, Linz and Ioannina. Other locations include a location in the United States.

=== Acquisitions ===
- 2020: Ubimax, a German specialized augmented reality software provider for wearables
- 2021: Upskill, a United States industrial augmented reality software provider
- 2021: Xaleon, an Austrian customer engagement solutions provider
- 2021: Viscopic, a German mixed reality solutions provider
- 2024: 1E, a UK-based provider of Digital Employee Experience (DEX) software

== Products ==
=== Software ===
TeamViewer became known primarily for its remote access, control, and maintenance software for computers and mobile devices. The software, called TeamViewer Remote, supports all major desktop, smartphone, and tablet operating systems, including Windows, macOS, Android, and iOS. The software is free for private, non-commercial use. The subscription-based enterprise version for commercial use is called TeamViewer Tensor. There are interfaces to other applications and services, such as Microsoft Teams.

=== Platform ===
The TeamViewer platform enables the connection of a wide range of devices from regular IT equipment to robots and machines. It operates as a digital workplace platform. Through the acquisition of software provider 1E, the company integrated functions in the area of Digital Employee Experience (DEX), which are used for the early detection and automated rectification of device problems in order to reduce the potential impact on productivity. As part of this move, the company launched TeamViewer One, an integrated platform that bundles remote connectivity applications and DEX features. Additionally, TeamViewer offers augmented reality applications to help frontline workers simplify their work processes with step-by-step instructions, or to help service technicians remotely solve complex problems on machines.

== Sponsoring ==
From season 2020 to season 2025–2026, TeamViewer was the main sponsor of the Handball-Bundesliga teams of Frisch Auf Göppingen.

From season 2021–2022 to season 2023–2024, TeamViewer was the principal shirt sponsor of Manchester United. In December 2022, TeamViewer announced its intention to substantially reduce its involvement in agreement with the football club to take account of a changed market environment. Also in 2021, TeamViewer entered a partnership with the Mercedes-AMG Petronas Formula One Team and the Mercedes-EQ Formula E Team, who used the company's branding on cars and drivers' racing suits. The latter ended when the Mercedes team withdrew from Formula E after the 2022 season.
