= Ulrike Flach =

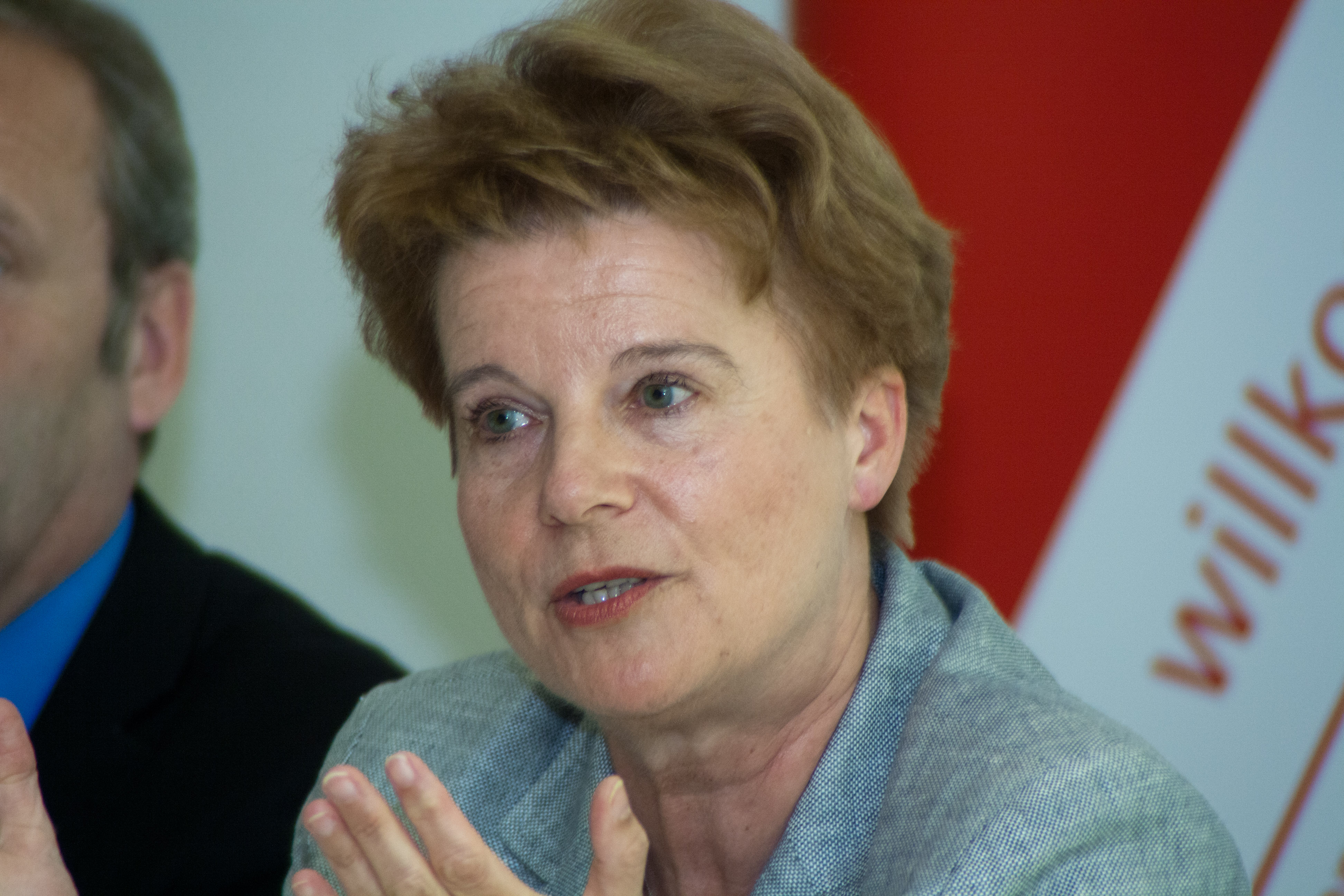

Parliamentary State Secretary at the Federal Ministry of Health
- In office 2011–2013
- Chancellor: Angela Merkel
- Minister: Daniel Bahr

Personal details
- Born: 1 January 1951 Oberhausen, West Germany
- Party: Free Democratic Party
- Education: Johannes Gutenberg University Mainz
- Occupation: Translator, politician

Ulrike Flach (born 1 January 1951) is a German former politician of the Free Democratic Party (FDP). She served as a member of the Bundestag from 1998 to 2013 and as Parliamentary State Secretary at the Federal Ministry of Health from 2011 to 2013.

== Early life and education ==
Flach was born in Oberhausen, North Rhine-Westphalia, on 1 January 1951. She studied applied linguistics at Johannes Gutenberg University Mainz and Ealing Technical College in London from 1969 to 1974, receiving a diploma in translation in 1974. From 1986 to 1996 she studied economics part-time at the University of Hagen.

== Professional career ==
From 1974 to 2005, Flach worked as a diploma translator for Siemens, in its Power Engineering division in Mülheim.

== Political career ==
Flach was elected to the German Bundestag for the FDP in 1998, representing the electoral constituency of Mülheim an der Ruhr. She remained a member of the Bundestag until 2013.

From 2000 to 2005, she served as chairwoman of the Bundestag Committee on Education, Research and Technology Assessment. From 2005 to 2009, she was technology-policy spokesperson for the FDP parliamentary group and its representative on the Budget Committee. From 2009 to 2011, she served as deputy chairwoman of the FDP parliamentary group and as its health-policy spokesperson. She was also the FDP's principal rapporteur on the Budget Committee for the Federal Ministries of Economics and Technology, Health, and Education and Research.

=== Parliamentary State Secretary ===
In 2011, Flach was appointed Parliamentary State Secretary at the Federal Ministry of Health. She served under Federal Minister of Health Daniel Bahr until 2013.

In this capacity, she represented the Federal Ministry of Health in parliamentary proceedings. In November 2012, for example, she responded in the Bundestag to questions concerning regulations implementing the law on preimplantation genetic diagnosis (PID).

Flach was also one of the parliamentarians who initiated a cross-party bill regulating preimplantation genetic diagnosis. The Bundestag passed the bill on 7 July 2011 by 326 votes to 260, with eight abstentions. The legislation provided for restricted authorization of PID under specified circumstances.

As Parliamentary State Secretary, Flach also represented the Federal Ministry of Health in international health cooperation. In June 2013, she travelled to Ulaanbaatar, Mongolia, where she participated in the First National Forum on Infection Prevention and Control and discussed cooperation in hospital hygiene between Germany and Mongolia.

Flach did not return to the Bundestag after the 2013 federal election.

== Later career ==
From 2014, Flach served as a member of the supervisory board of CompuGroup Medical.

In 2013, she received an honorary doctorate from the Nicolae Testemițanu State University of Medicine and Pharmacy in Chișinău, Moldova.

== Personal life ==
Flach is married and has two children.
