= SMA Solar Technology =

German solar energy equipment supplier

SMA Solar Technology AG
- Type: Aktiengesellschaft
- Traded as: FWB: S92 S92; SDAX
- ISIN: DE000A0DJ6J9
- Industry: Renewable energy, Photovoltaics
- Founded: 1981
- Founder: Werner Kleinkauf, Günther Cramer (1952-2015), Peter Drews and Reiner Wettlaufer
- Headquarters: Niestetal, Germany
- Key people: Jürgen Reinert (CEO), Uwe Kleinkauf (chairman of the supervisory board)
- Products: Inverters for solar energy systems
- Revenue: € 1,904.1 million (2023)
- Number of employees: 4,377 (December 2023)

SMA Solar Technology AG (meaning "System-, Mess- and Anlagentechnik") is a German solar energy equipment supplier founded in 1981 and headquartered in Niestetal, Northern Hesse, Germany. SMA is a producer and manufacturer of solar inverters for photovoltaics systems with grid connection, off-grid power supply and backup operations.

The company has offices in 20 countries.

== Company profile ==
SMA had 4,377 employees and generated worldwide sales of 1,904.1 million euros and an EBITDA of 311 million euros in 2023. It is the largest Europe-based solar technology company by revenue. The company is focused on the development and manufacture of system technology for photovoltaics, battery storage systems and energy management. Earlier, SMA included divisions for railway engineering, and industrial computers. SMA is represented in Germany, the US, Chile, Brazil, Mexico, Canada, Spain, Italy, France, China, Australia, Belgium, India, Poland, Japan, UK, South Africa, South Korea, Thailand, Türkiye and the United Arab Emirates.

In 2011, SMA acquired one of its long-standing suppliers of electronic components, the Polish company dtw Sp oo. Then in 2012, SMA acquired a majority stake in the Chinese company Jiangsu Zeversolar New Energy Co., Ltd., a solar inverter manufacturer, followed by the solar inverter operations of the Danish company Danfoss in 2013. In April 2016, SMA acquired a 27% stake in Tigo Energy, Inc. in the context of a capital increase. SMA is also obtaining exclusive rights for worldwide sales of the smart module technology TS4 Retrofit. In January 2018, SMA founded the new subsidiary for digital energy, coneva GmbH, headquartered in Munich. SMA sold its Chinese companies in 2019.

== History ==
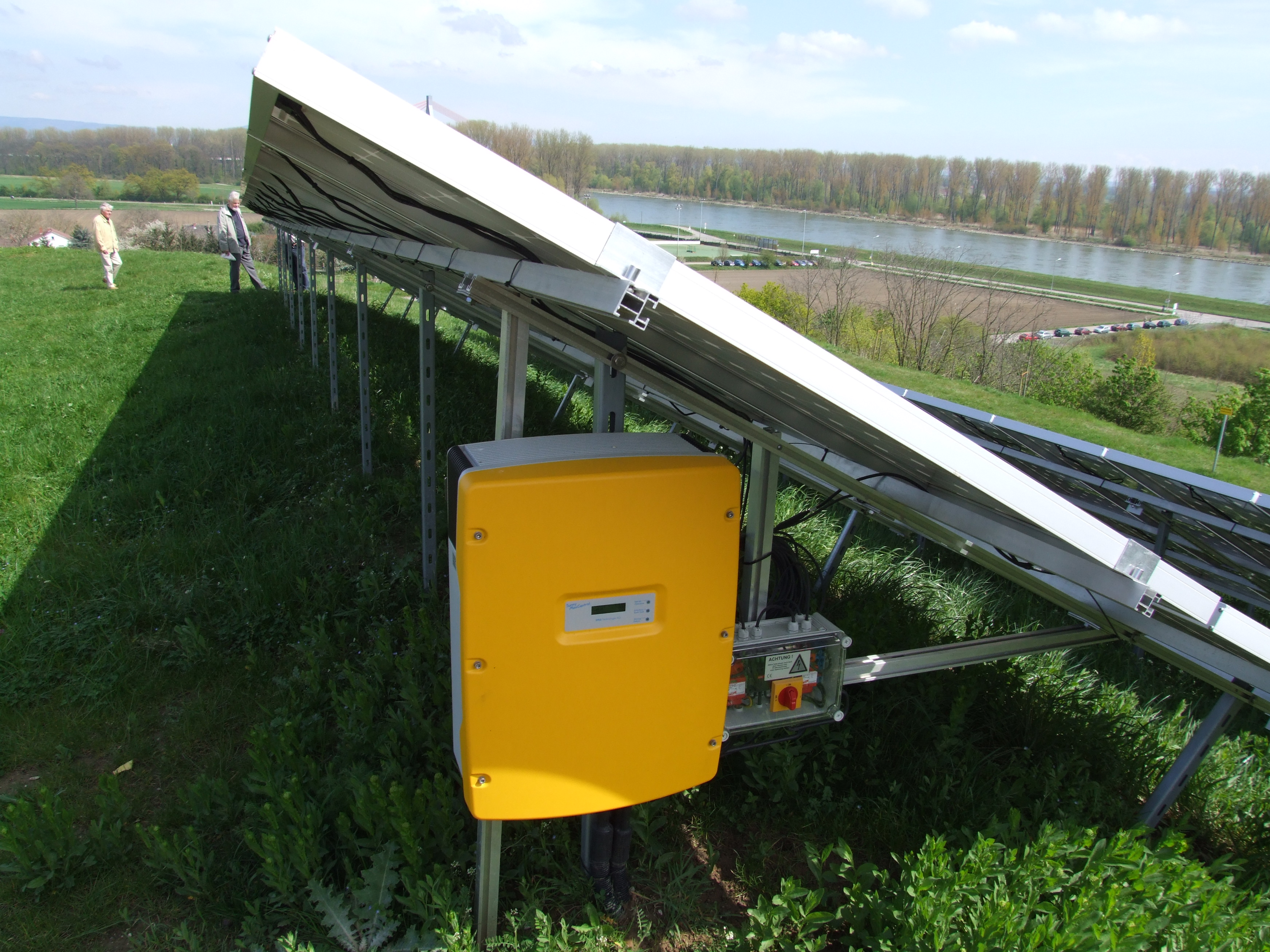
A Sunny Mini Central mounted with a ground-mounted system in Speyer, down the Rhine

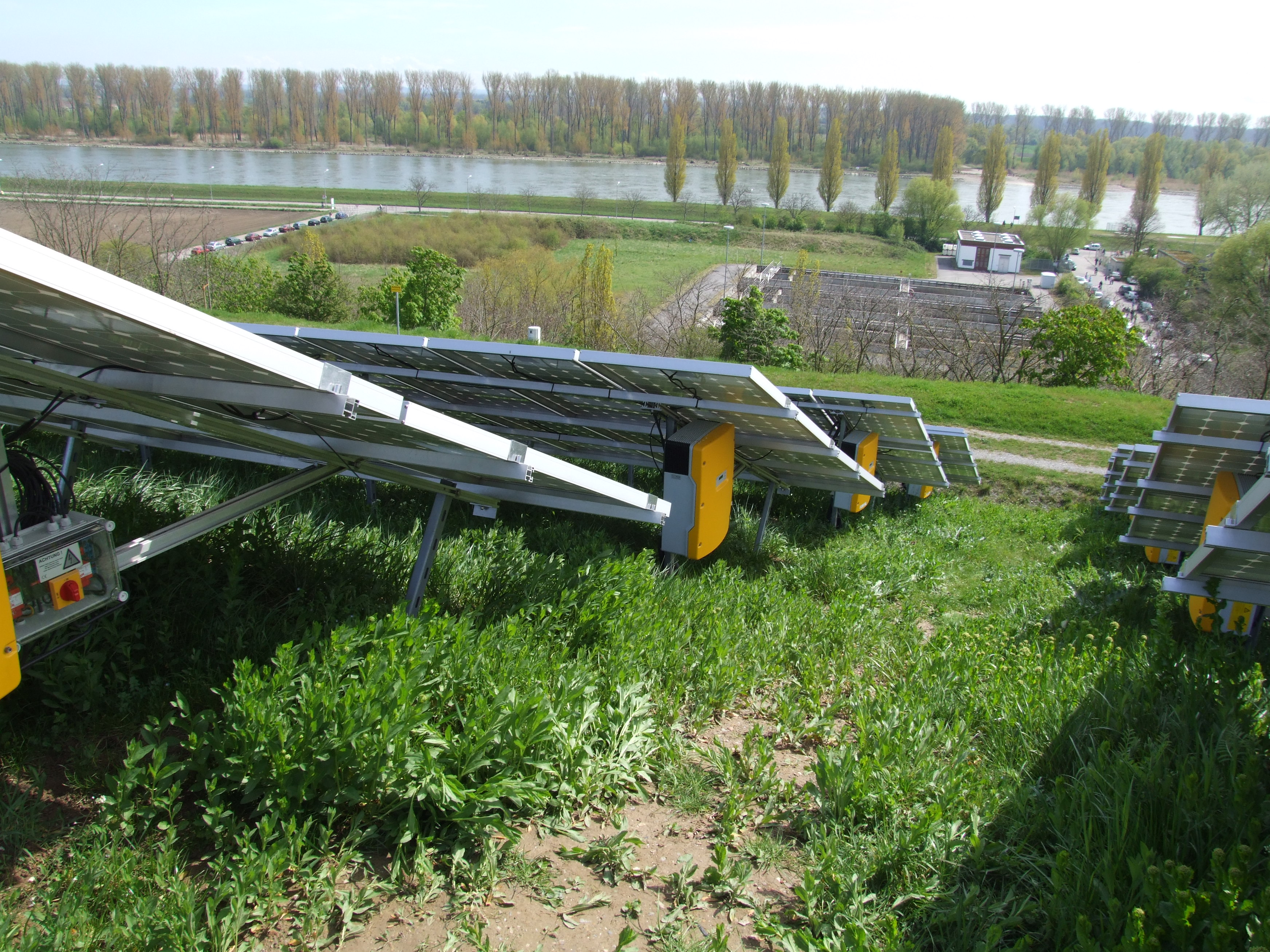
A Sunny Mini Central mounted next to photovoltaic solar modules

The company was founded by Werner Kleinkauf and former board members Günther Cramer (1952–2015), Peter Drews and Reiner Wettlaufer as a separate company from the University of Kassel, subsequently renamed in 2004 to SMA Technologie AG. In 2006 Pierre-Pascal Urbon expanded the board. In June 2008, the name was changed to the present SMA Solar Technology in order to emphasize the focus on solar and the internationalization of the company. At the same time, the railway technology division was spun into SMA Railway Technology GmbH, which was sold to Chinese Beijing Dinghan in 2017.

Larger changes to the board became effective after the Annual General Meeting in June 2009. One of the founders, Reiner Wettlaufer, joined the supervisory board. Roland Grebe was added as chief technology officer and Marko Werner as chief marketing & sales officer; both were more than 20 years with the company. In April 2010, the board also had Jürgen Dolle in human resources and Uwe Hertel in operations. Since the 2011 Annual General Meeting, Pierre-Pascal Urbon became CEO, responsible for the strategic direction of the company and the continuation of internationalization. Two founders, Drews and Cramer, then joined to the supervisory board. Uwe Hertel retired from the board in 2011. In November 2012, Lydia Sommer joined the board and took over the finance and law responsibilities from Urbon, who previously held this portfolio in a dual role as chief executive officer and chief financial officer. Since May 2013, Lydia Sommer was also responsible for human resources and labor relations director, after Jürgen Dolle retired from the board. In January 2015 Martin Kinne took over board responsibility for sales and service.

As part of the company's transformation in 2015, the supervisory board of SMA reduced the number of managing board members. Lydia Sommer left the board in February 2015, and Martin Kinne in December 2015. From January 2016, the managing board of SMA comprised the following members: Roland Grebe (board member for human resources and IT), Juergen Reinert (board member for operations and technology), Pierre-Pascal Urbon (chief executive officer, board member for strategy, finance/legal and sales).

Roland Grebe stepped down from the managing board as per December 31, 2016. As of January 1, 2017, the managing board of SMA Solar Technology AG comprises the following members: Ulrich Hadding (board member for finance, human resources and legal), Jürgen Reinert (deputy CEO, board member for technology and operations), Pierre-Pascal Urbon (CEO, board member for strategy, sales and service).

Pierre-Pascal Urbon left the company on December 31, 2018, at his own request, after having resigned from the managing board in agreement with the supervisory board on October 15, 2018. Ulrich Hadding, Chief Financial Officer, Human Resources and Legal Affairs of SMA Solar Technology AG, left the Company at his own request on May 31, 2022, after many years of service. Barbara Gregor, Managing Director and CFO of thyssenkrupp Materials Trading GmbH and the international thyssenkrupp Materials Trading Group, has been appointed to the Managing Board as his successor. Jürgen Reinert is now chief executive officer of SMA Solar Technology AG and is responsible for strategy, sales and service in addition to operations and technology. Barbara Gregor is responsible for the SMA board functions of Finance, Legal and Capital Market Communications.

== Products ==
SMA sells photovoltaic solar inverters as product families using the Sunny Boy name for home systems, Sunny Tripower and Sunny Highpower for medium-sized plants through the multi-megawatt range and Sunny Central for ground-mounted systems and solar farms, often from 500 kW to the several-megawatt range for self-consumption of solar power and feeding into the utility grid. SMA also produces the Sunny Island for independent, stand-alone systems as well as off-grid and on-grid battery systems, the Sunny Boy Storage and the Sunny Central Storage for grid-tied battery systems of all sizes. The inverter products are complemented by components for energy management, system monitoring and data analysis as well as services ranging to operations and maintenance of large-scale PV power plants.

== Stock ==
The company's stock shares have been listed on the Prime Standard of the Frankfurt Stock Exchange since June 27, 2008. The company's stock has been qualified for the technology index TecDAX. With the reorganization of the DAX indices by Deutsche Börse on September 24, 2018, the SMA stock moved from TecDAX to SDAX. Since September 2008, the stock has been part of ÖkoDAX and was listed in 2009 in the 30 Index Global photovoltaic. Currently, 25 percent of the shares are in free float.

== Awards ==
SMA products have also been awarded the Intersolar Award, ees Award and Smarter E Award.
