= Atoss =

German software company

ATOSS Software SE
- Type: Public (Societas Europaea)
- Traded as: FWB: AOF; SDAX component; TecDAX component
- ISIN: DE0005104400
- Industry: Software
- Founded: 1987; 39 years ago
- Founder: Andreas Obereder
- Headquarters: Munich, Germany
- Key people: Andreas Obereder (CEO and Founder); Christof Leiber (CFO); Pritim Kumar Krishnamoorthy (CTO)
- Revenue: €189.2 million (2025)
- Number of employees: 856 (2025)
- Website: www.atoss.com/en

ATOSS Software SE is a publicly listed company that provides software for workforce management.

The online digital workforce management software integrates time management, workforce scheduling, personnel requirements planning, and mobile time recording. According to the company's claims, it is used by around 15,600 customers in 50 countries.

== History ==
Andreas Obereder founded ATOSS Software GmbH in Munich in 1987. In 1999, ATOSS was converted into a stock corporation, followed by the IPO in 2000. In 2003, the company was admitted to the Prime Standard of the German Stock Exchange. In 2004, a development site was opened in Timișoara, Romania. On July 1, 2021, ATOSS Software AG was admitted to the SDAX of Deutsche Börse AG. Additionally, ATOSS was included in the TecDAX of Deutsche Börse AG as one of five German software companies, with trading starting on May 10, 2023.

According to the company, approximately 16 percent of the group's annual revenue is invested in the further development of Atoss products and solutions. Since 2015, all ATOSS product suites have been available in the cloud.

In 2023, General Atlantic acquired around 19,99% of the shares, making it the second-largest shareholder behind Andreas Obereder's AOB Invest GmbH.

== Locations ==
In addition to the head office in Munich, there are branches in Berlin, Frankfurt, Hamburg, Stuttgart, Meerbusch, Osnabrück, Brussels (Belgium), Utrecht (Netherlands), Paris (France) and Stockholm (Sweden). There are also subsidiaries in Cham, Vienna (Austria), Zurich (Switzerland), Timișoara (Romania), Gurgaon (India) and Sibiu (Romania).

== Finances ==
In 2023, ATOSS generated sales of 151.2 million euros (previous year: 113.9 million euros) and an operating result (EBITA) of 51.8 million euros (previous year: 30.8 million euros). Net income for the year remained at 35.8 million euros (previous year: 19.4 million euros). The company employed over 770 people across Europe.
