= Blaubeuren =

- Town
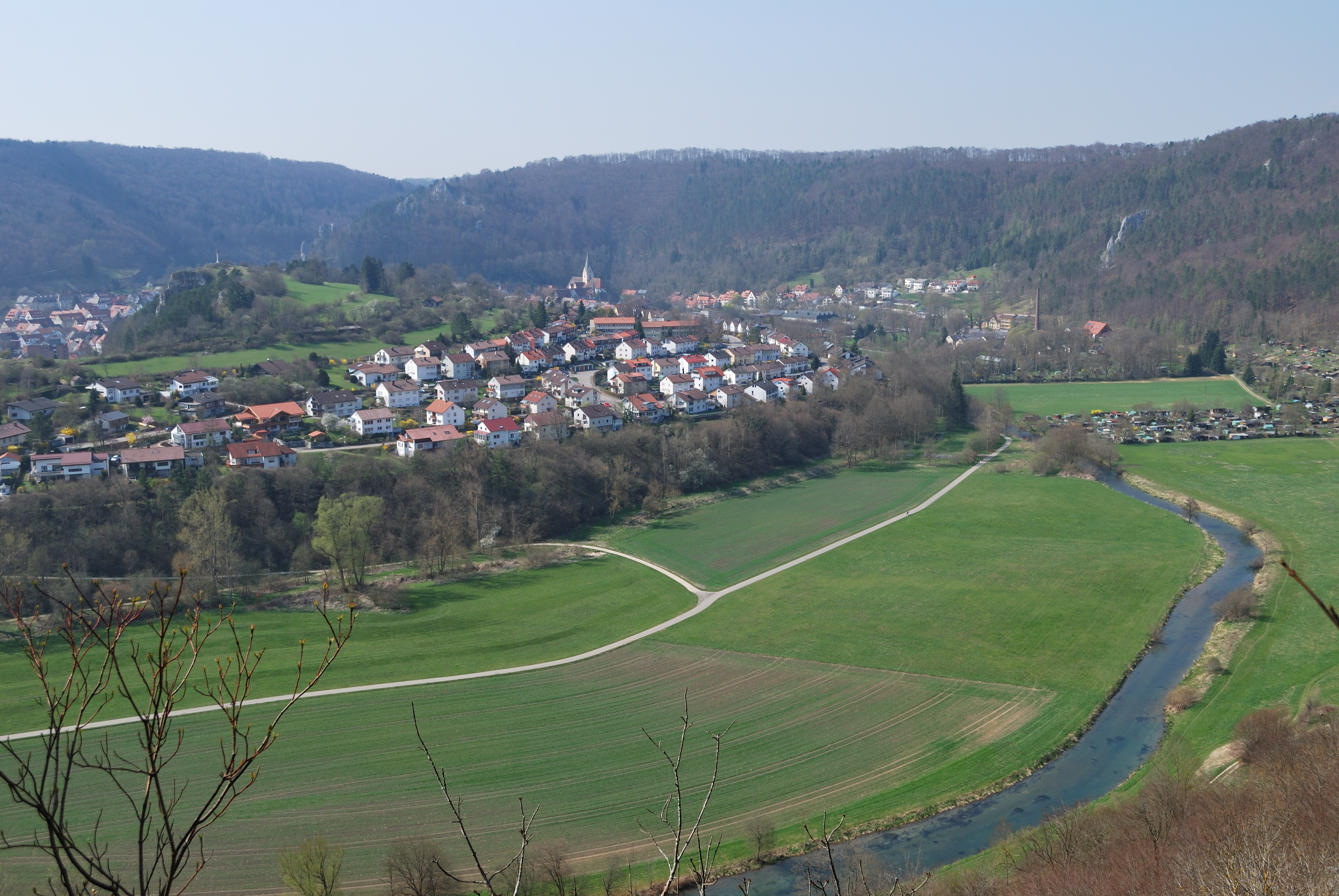
- Blaubeuren and the Blau River

- Coat of arms

- Location of Blaubeuren within Alb-Donau-Kreis district
- Interactive map of Blaubeuren
- Location within Germany Location within Baden-Württemberg
- Coordinates: 48°24′43″N 9°47′6″E
- Country: Germany
- State: Baden-Württemberg
- Admin. region: Tübingen
- District: Alb-Donau-Kreis

Government
  - Mayor (2026–34): Robin Menholz

Area
  - Total: 79.11 km^{2} (30.54 sq mi)
- Elevation: 516 m (1,693 ft)

Population (2025-12-31)
  - Total: 12,669
  - Density: 160.1/km^{2} (414.8/sq mi)
- Time zone: UTC+01:00 (CET)
  - Summer (DST): UTC+02:00 (CEST)
- Postal codes: 89143
- Dialling codes: 07344
- Vehicle registration: UL
- Website: www.blaubeuren.de

Blaubeuren (German pronunciation: [ˌblaʊ̯ˈbɔʏʁən]) is a town in the district of Alb-Donau near Ulm in Baden-Württemberg, Germany.

As of December 2007 it had 11,963 inhabitants.

== Geography ==
=== Geographical location ===
The core city Blaubeuren lies at the foot of the Swabian Jura, 16 kilometres (9.9 mi) west of Ulm.

=== Neighboring communities ===
The city borders to the north with Suppingen and Berghülen, on the east with Blaustein, in the south with Ulm and Erbach and in the west with Schelklingen and Heroldstatt.

=== Constituent ===
The city Blaubeuren consists of the districts Blaubeuren, Gerhausen, Altental, Asch, Beiningen, Pappelau, Beimerstetten, Sotzenhausen, Seißen, Wennenden, Sonderbuch and Weiler with the core city Blaubeuren and 18 other villages, hamlets, farms and (individual) houses.

== Castles ==
Within the town borough are the ruins of a number of castles: Ruck Castle and Blauenstein Castle, Hohengerhausen Castle (in Gerhausen), Günzelburg Castle and Burkartsweiler (both in Seißen), Sirgenstein Castle (in Weiler), and Gleißenburg Castle (in Beiningen).

== Coat of arms ==
The coat of arms for the town shows the so-called Blaumännle (little blue man), a small man dressed in blue on a gold background.

== Economy and infrastructure ==
=== Companies ===
The Merckle group (pharmaceutical industry) is headquartered in Blaubeuren. Blaubeuren is also the headquarters of Centrotherm Photovoltaics.

=== Transport ===
Blaubeuren is located on the Ulm–Sigmaringen railway. Once an hour regional express trains run to Sigmaringen and Ulm, and every two hours to Donaueschingen and Titisee-Neustadt. Blaubeuren belongs to the Donau-Iller-Nahverkehrsverbund (DING). Blaubeuren is located on the Bundesstraße 28 between Reutlingen and Ulm. In the city also begins the Bundesstraße 492 to Ehingen. The next junction of the Bundesautobahn 8 from Stuttgart to Munich is 12 kilometers (7 miles) away.

== Religion ==
Blaubeuren is the seat of the church district Blaubeuren of the Evangelical-Lutheran Church in Württemberg. The Roman Catholic church Mariä Heimsuchung is located in Blaubeuren and has a branch church in Gerhausen. The New Apostolic Church also has here a municipality.

The Muslim community in Blaubeuren is largely Turkish dominated, originated by the migration of workers since the early 1960s from Turkey.

== Buildings ==
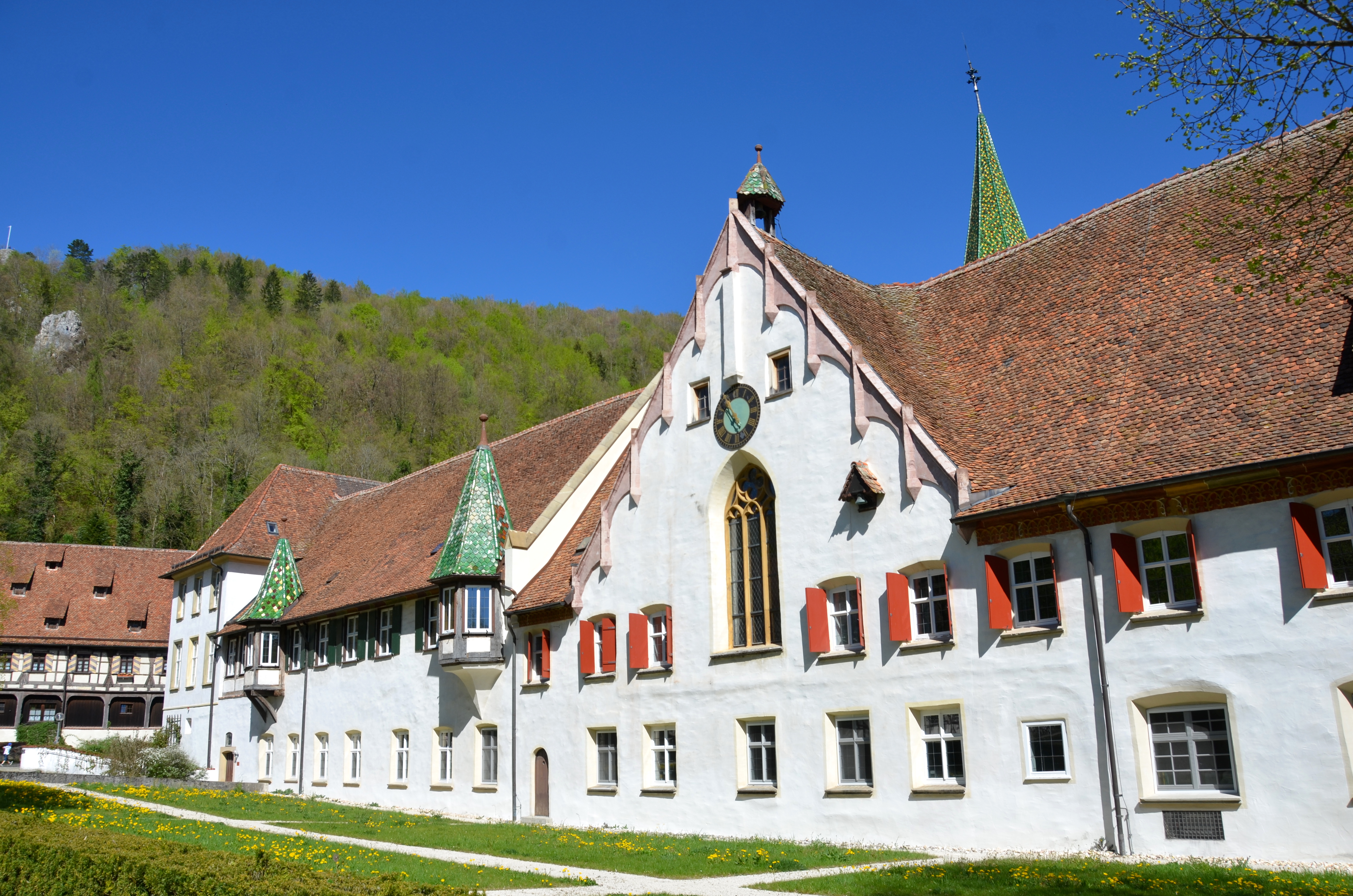
Blaubeuren Abbey

Hammer mill at the Blautopf

Near the Blautopf lies the former Blaubeuren Abbey (founded in 1085).

Blaubeuren also has an old town with many half-timbered buildings.

In 1926 the "Ruckenkreuz" was erected on a rocky mountain, an 8.4-metre (28 ft) tall memorial cross made of reinforced concrete with a span of 2.8 metres (9.2 ft), which commemorates the fallen of the First World War.

== Museums ==
The "Urgeschichtliches Museum Blaubeuren" displays archaeological findings, including the Venus of Hohle Fels, the earliest known undisputed example of a depiction of a human being in prehistoric art. Scientific findings, experimental archeology and modern museum education can be found under one roof.

The former bathhouse of the monks in the monastery presents in the basement historic bathing facilities, and on the upper floors the local museum with furniture and objects from Blaubeuren.

== Natural monuments ==
The most striking sight in Blaubeuren is the Blautopf, a karst spring. The Blautopf is 21 meters deep and one of the deepest and largest sources in Germany, with a flow out of minimum 310 L/s and maximum 32,000 L/s.

== Regular events ==
A unique sled race takes place in Gerhausen every year. In this event, known as the Patenterrennen (Patent Race), teams consisting of 'drivers' and 'brakesmen' compete against each other with their historic sleds.

== Points of interest ==
- Blautopf, source of the river Blau
- Ruckenkreuz
- Blaubeuren Abbey

== Notable people from Blaubeuren ==
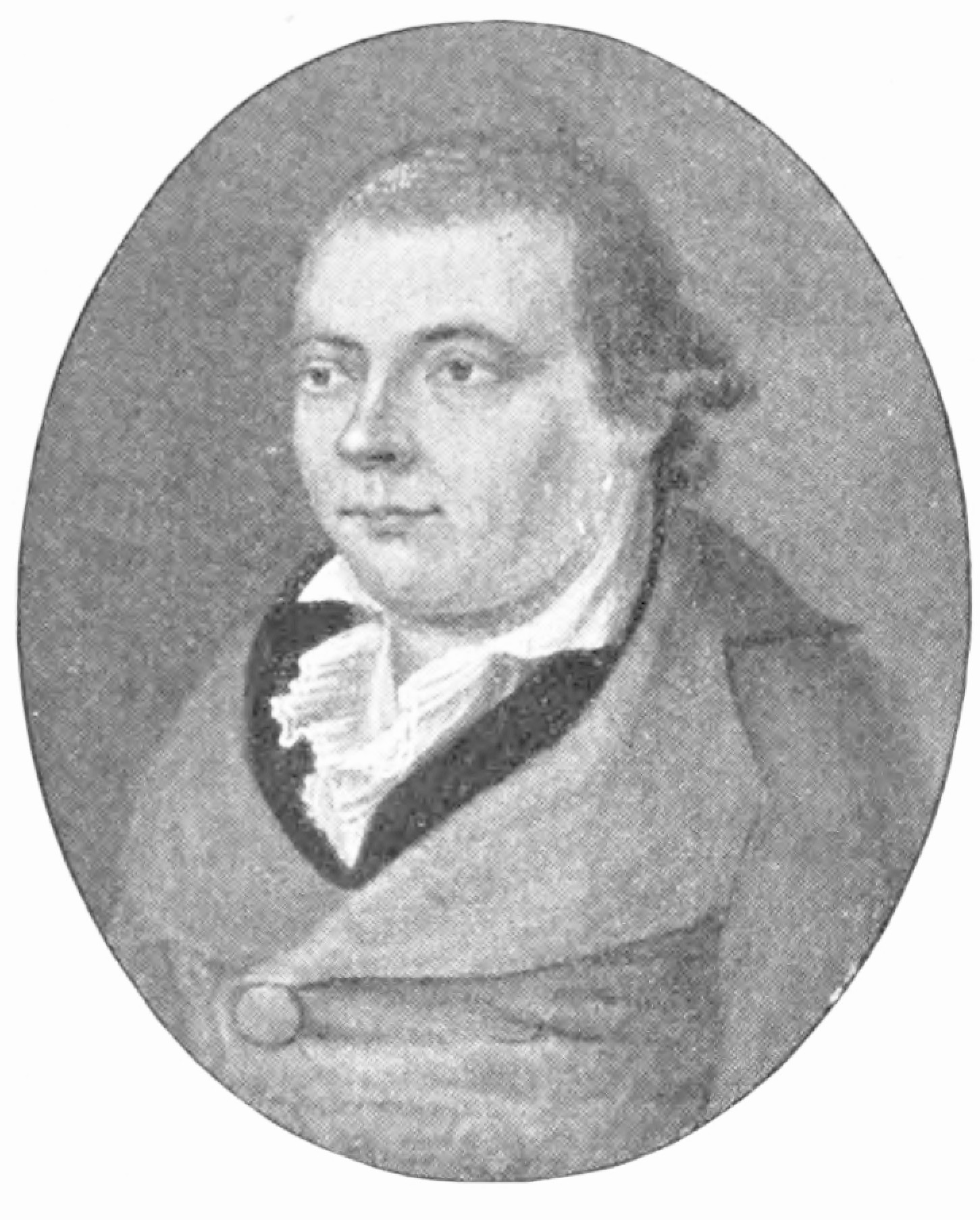
Karl Philipp Conz around 1793

- Christoph Gottfried Bardili (1761–1808), philosopher
- Karl Philipp Conz (1762–1827), poet and writer, was a pupil of the monastery school in Blaubeuren
- Matthäus Hipp (1813–1893), watchmaker and inventor
- Wilhelm Friedrich von Drescher (1820–1897), Württembergian civil servant
- Gustav Adolph Bockshammer (1824–1882), Württembegian civil servant
- Hans Gassebner (1902–1966), painter and graphican
- Wilhelm Schäfer (1902–1979), politician (NSDAP), district administrator in Crailsheim
- Wolfgang Schürle (born 1941), politician (CDU), district administrator of Alb-Donau-Kreis
- Rudolf Hausmann (born 1954), politician (SPD), Member of Landtag 1996–2011
- René Okle (born 1983), footballer

=== Personalities who have worked in Blaubeuren ===
- Adolf Merckle (1934–2009), entrepreneur, founder of the pharmaceutical company Ratiopharm
- Georg Hiller (born 1946), former mayor and since 2002 honorary citizen of Blaubeuren
