= VEMS =

VEMS is a commercial engine management system. VEMS is unlike most other EMS's in that it used to be public domain and then a form of open source.

== History ==
The original version of VEMS was called MegaSquirtAVR and was a re-write of the popular but inadequate (at the time) MegaSquirt system.

== Hardware ==
VEMS can be purchased as a pre-made board or a complete system with several options in between. Most of the design is built with SMD components to keep size down and reliability up.

=== Microcontroller ===
VEMS uses the AVR Atmega128 which is significantly more powerful than the original MS1 CPU.

=== Revisions ===
The early MS based version was called 2.0 however that has been out of circulation for some time. The 3.0 board was the first "GenBoard" variant. Development was closed at 3.2 and the current version is 3.6. All 3.X versions incorporate one or more wide band controller.

== Firmware ==
VEMS firmware is primarily written in the C (programming language), however some parts are distributed in binary and not C for IP protection reasons with an NDA.

=== Documentation ===
Firmware revisions are issued very frequently and it is constant development. Latest firmware releases have many advanced features such as double continuous variable camshaft control, GPS and SD card logging, advanced motorsport features (N2O control, transbrake creep etc.). New features are Electronic throttle control and can bus.

== Tuning Software ==
Tuning is done with either MegaTune or VemsTune. Until recently Megatune as written by Eric Fahlgren for the MegaSquirt system was only option. MegaTune is licensed under GPL and can therefore be used by anyone. While excellent for Megasquirt, it does not cover all aspects of VEMS, so complete setup and tuning is impossible. It can and has caused incorrect parameters to be written to VEMS causing unpredictable performance.

At present time (2011) MegaTune is mostly obsolete on VEMS as all recent firmware versions are only compatible with VemsTune, a user interface that was built from scratch and covers all aspects of VEMS tuning (including firmware updates directly from VEMS servers, WBo2 sensor calibration, logging and of course, tuning). Some users who run older configs still use MegaTune but majority is now using VemsTune which, after long developer phase, is now very usable.

== Licenses ==
The no longer available MSAVR source was MegaSquirt based and therefore surrounded by some controversy. The code was rewritten and has since version 3.2 been closed source.
