= Ruckenkreuz =

World War I memorial in Baden-Württemberg, Germany

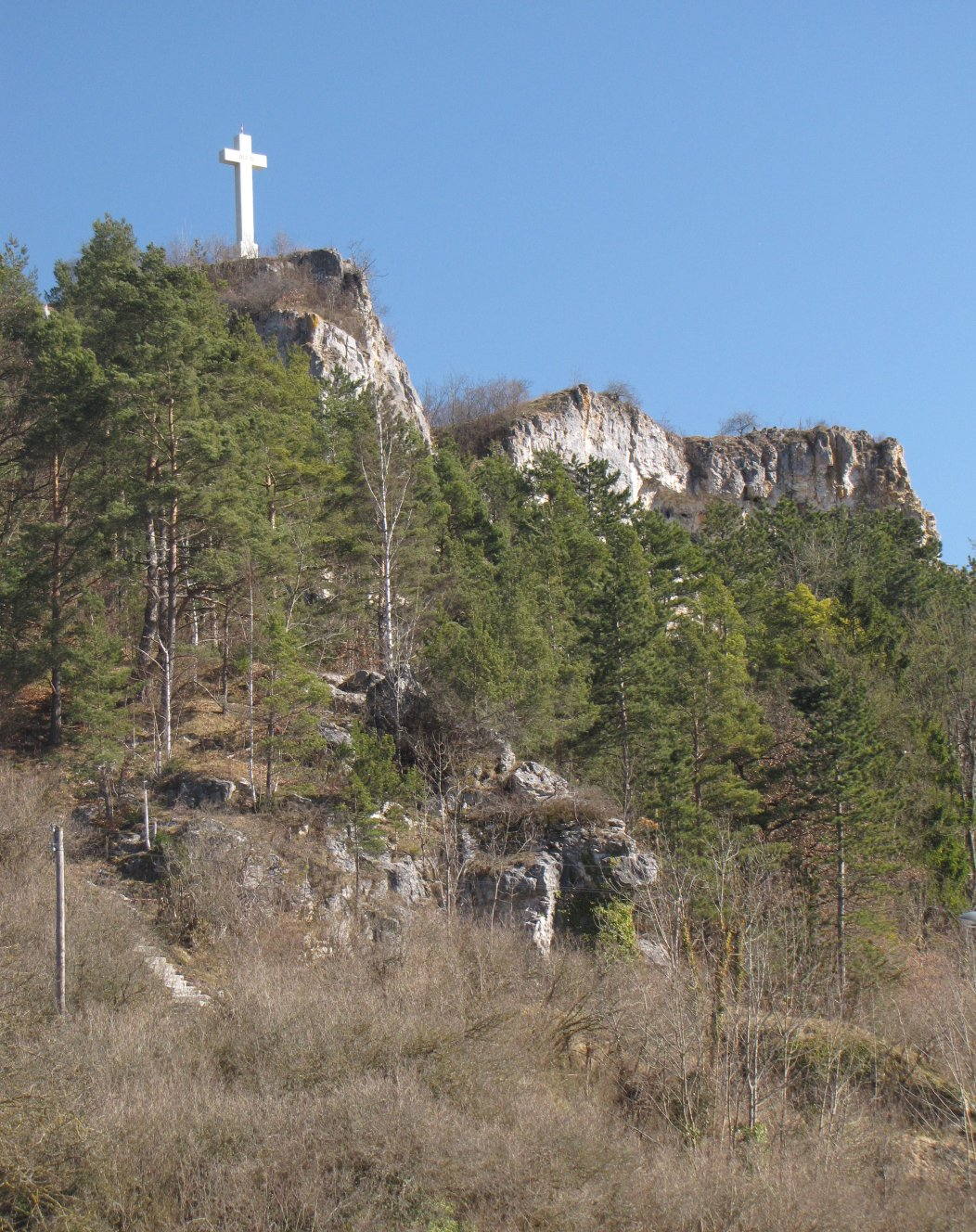

The Ruckenkreuz (Rucken Cross) is an 8.4 metre tall, 2.80 metre wide memorial cross of reinforced concrete. It stands on a rocky mountain at Blaubeuren, Baden-Württemberg, Germany. It is in memory of the inhabitants of Blaubeuren killed in World War I. The Ruckenkreuz was completed on November 21, 1926.

Geographical coordinates: 48°24′38″N 9°47′30″E
