= Redcare Pharmacy =

Online pharmacy retailer

- Company type: Aktiengesellschaft
- Traded as: MDAX
- ISIN: NL0012044747
- Industry: E-Commerce
- Founded: 2001; 25 years ago
- Headquarters: Sevenum, Netherlands
- Revenue: €1.8 billion (2023)
- Operating income: −17,070,000 euro (2023)
- Net income: −12,040,000 euro (2023)
- Total assets: 1,021,600,000 euro (2023)
- Number of employees: 2,075 (2023)
- Website: redcare-pharmacy.com

Old logo until 2023

Redcare Pharmacy N.V. (until 2023 Shop Apotheke Europe) is a publicly listed mail-order pharmacy retailer headquartered in Sevenum, Netherlands.

The company has locations in Sevenum, Cologne, Berlin, Munich, Warsaw, Milan, Lille, Eindhoven and Tongeren. The product range includes over-the-counter and prescription drugs, nutritional supplements and beauty and health products.

The company is currently active in Germany, Austria, France, Belgium, Italy, Netherlands and Switzerland.

== History ==
Shop Apotheke was founded in 2001 as the online store of a bricks-and-mortar pharmacy in Cologne. When mail-order sales of non-prescription medicines (OTC) were permitted by law in 2004, shop-apotheke.com was one of the first online retailers in Germany to sell OTC products and offer pharmaceutical advice. In 2010, the company relocated its logistics and sales activities to Venlo in the Netherlands, close to the German-Dutch border. Shop Apotheke began its international expansion in 2012 with the launch of the Austrian webshop shop-apotheke.at, followed three years later by Belgium and France.

In 2016, the company went public as Shop Apotheke Europe and became part of the SDAX of the Frankfurt Stock Exchange. International expansion continued with the acquisition of the Belgian online pharmacy group Farmaline in 2016 and the associated market entry in Italy and the Netherlands. The following year, Shop Apotheke Europe acquired Europa Apotheek, which specialized in the sale of prescription medicines to customers in Germany. In 2018, Shop Apotheke Europe expanded with the acquisition of the Berlin-based company nu3, which sells functional nutrition products.

Shop Apotheke Europe moved into its new headquarters in Sevenum in 2020 and relocated its entire logistics operations to the new, adjacent logistics center in 2021. The new site has an area of 40,000 square meters. In 2021, the company also entered the field of electronic prescription processing and digital medication management with the acquisition of the Munich-based company Smartpatient and the Dutch provider MedApp.

Subject to approval by the authorities, the Swiss business (shop-apotheke.ch) is to be merged with Galenica's Mediservice AG to form a joint venture in 2023, with Shop Apotheke Europe holding a 51% stake in the new company and Galenica 49%. Galenica would receive an 8% stake in Shop Apotheke Europe. Permission of the deal was granted in May 2023.

On June 13, 2023, Shop Apotheke Europe was renamed Redcare Pharmacy.

== Finances ==
The key trends for Redcare Pharmacy are, as of each financial year:

Year	2017	2018	2019	2020	2021	2022	2023
Total revenue (Euro mio.)	284	540	701	968	1,060	1,204	1,799
Net profit (Euro mio.)	(21)	(34)	(36)	(17)	(74)	(78)	(12)
Total Assets (Euro mio.)	298	351	434	544	793	742	1,049
Number of employees	...	843	1,011	1,220	1,569	1,847	2,075
