= MDAX =

German stock market index

- Foundation: 19 January 1996
- Operator: STOXX (Qontigo, Deutsche Börse)
- Exchanges: Frankfurt Stock Exchange
- Constituents: 50
- Type: Mid-cap, non-technology sectors
- Market cap: €42.9 billion (end 2008)
- Weighting method: Capitalization-weighted
- Related indices: DAX, TecDAX, SDAX

The MDAX is a stock index which lists German companies trading on the Frankfurt Stock Exchange. The index is calculated by Deutsche Börse.

It includes the 50 Prime Standard shares that rank in size immediately below the companies included in the DAX index. The company size is calculated based on a combination of order book volume and market capitalization. The index is based on prices generated in the electronic trading system Xetra.

In 2021, in response to the Wirecard scandal, the number of constituents in the DAX was increased from 30 to 40, while the number of constituents in the MDAX was reduced from 60 to 50.

== Companies ==
The following 50 companies make up the index as of the quarterly review effective on January 15, 2023.

Logo	Name	Industry	Index weighting	Number of Shares	Free-float- in Mio. €	Location	Symbol
	Aixtron	Semiconductor industry	2,98	113.402.370	4.325,62	Herzogenrath	AIXA
	Aroundtown	Real estate	1.49	1,536,397,797	2,061.72	Luxembourg (Luxembourg)	AT1
	Aurubis	Metals	1,59	44.956.723	2.307,09	Hamburg	NDA
	Bechtle	IT services	2,57	126.000.000	3.741,68	Neckarsulm	BC8
	Befesa	Waste management	1.11		1,530.47	Ratingen	BFSA
	Bilfinger					Mannheim	GBF
	Carl Zeiss Meditec	Medical technology	2,45	89.440.570	3.555,14	Jena	AFX
	CTS Eventim	Leisure-events	2,56	96.000.000	3.713,64	Munich	EVD
	Delivery Hero	Delivery service	4,23	269.536.421	6.136,97	Berlin	DHER
	Lufthansa	Airlines	5,69	1.195.485.644	8.267,54	Cologne	LHA
	Encavis	Renewable energy	1,23	161.030.176	1.787,32	Hamburg	ECV
	Evonik	Chemistry	2,54	466.000.000	3.695,85	Essen	EVK
	Evotec	Biotechnology	2,09	177.185.736	3.044,43	Hamburg	EVT
	Fraport	Airport operator	1,41	92.468.704	2.056,62	Frankfurt	FRA
	Freenet	Telecommunications	2,07	118.900.598	3.005,81	Büdelsdorf	FNTN
	Fresenius Medical Care	Medical technology	5,26	293.413.449	7.630,52	Hof (Saale)	FRE
	Fuchs Petrolub	Chemistry	1,84	69.500.000	2.671,54	Mannheim	FPE3
	GEA Group	Machinery	3,51	180.492.172	5.098,68	Düsseldorf	G1A
	Gerresheimer	Packaging	1,99	34.540.000	2.900,31	Düsseldorf	GXI
	Hella	Automotive	1,17	111.111.112	1.697,81	Lippstadt	HLE
	HelloFresh	Meal kit	1,67	172.734.665	2.427,88	Berlin	HFG
	Hensoldt	Defence	0,85	105.000.000	1.246,59	Taufkirchen	HAG
	Hochtief	Construction	1,53	77.711.300	2.224,49	Essen	HOT
	Hugo Boss	Clothing, Accessories	2,75	70.400.000	3.997,45	Metzingen	BOSS
	Jenoptik		0,98	57.238.115	1.427,39	Jena	JEN
	Jungheinrich	Intralogistics, Mechanical engineering	1,10	48.000.000	1.603,20	Hamburg	JUN3
	K+S	Mining (fertilizer and salt)	1,79	191.400.000	2.599,89	Kassel	SDF
	KION Group	Handling equipment	1,87	131.198.647	2.714,83	Frankfurt	KGX
	Knorr-Bremse	Manufacturing	2,63	161.200.000	3.825,02	Munich	KBX
	Krones					Neutraubling	KRN
	Lanxess	Chemistry	1,59	86.346.303	2.316,05	Cologne	LXS
	LEG Immobilien	Real estate	3,96	74.109.276	5.755,33	Düsseldorf	LEG
	Nemetschek	Software	3,08	115.500.000	4.481,19	Munich	NEM
	Nordex		0,87	236.450.364	1.265,21	Hamburg	NDX1
	Süss Microtec SE	Semiconductors	Garching bei München				
	Puma	Sports equipment	3,67	150.824.640	5.325,69	Herzogenaurach	PUM
	Rational	Manufacturing	2.03	11,370,000	2,814.89	Landsberg am Lech	RAA
	Redcare Pharmacy	Pharmacy	1,53	20.203.286	2.223,39	Venlo (Netherlands)	RDC
	RTL Group	Media	0,86	154.742.806	1.247,97	Luxembourg (Luxembourg)	RRTL
	Scout24	Online-market	3,15	75.000.000	4.570,77	Munich	G24
	Siltronic	Semiconductor industry				Munich	WAF
	Stabilus	Automotive	1.11		1,535.11	Koblenz	STM
	Ströer	Media	1,15	56.691.571	1.669,59	Cologne	SAX
	TAG Tegernsee Immobilien und Beteiligung	Real estate	1,55	175.489.025	2.262,05	Hamburg	TEG
	Talanx	Real Estate	2,45	253.350.943	3.556,99	Hanover	TLX
	TeamViewer	Software	1,26	180.000.000	1.829,63	Göppingen	TMV
	ThyssenKrupp	Conglomerate	2,13	622.531.741	3.102,07	Essen and Duisburg	TKA
	Traton					Munich	8TRA
	TUI	Tourism				Berlin, Hanover	TUI1
	United Internet	Telecommunications	1,07	192.000.000	1.553,43	Montabaur	UTDI
	Wacker Chemie	Chemistry	1,36	52.152.600	1.983,73	Munich	WCH

^Note 1: Source: de:MDAX.

== See also ==
- DAX
- SDAX
- TecDAX
- ÖkoDAX
