= Gerresheimer =

German manufacturer

Gerresheimer AG
- Company type: Aktiengesellschaft
- Traded as: FWB: GXI; MDAX
- Industry: Manufacturing
- Founded: 1864; 162 years ago
- Founder: Ferdinand Heye
- Headquarters: Düsseldorf, Germany
- Key people: Dietmar Siemssen, CEO, Bernd Metzner, Lukas Burkhardt; Axel Herberg (Chairman of the supervisory board)
- Revenue: €1,990.5 million (2023)
- Number of employees: 11,660 (2023)
- Website: gerresheimer.com

Gerresheimer AG (formerly Gerresheimer Glass AG) is a German manufacturer of primary packaging products for medication and drug delivery devices made of special-purpose glass and plastics with headquarters in Düsseldorf for the pharmaceutical and cosmetics industries. The company has production operations in Europe, the Americas and Asia.

== History ==
Gerresheimer Glas AG was established in 1864 by Ferdinand Heye (1838-1889). He managed the company until 1888, when it was converted into a stock corporation. The company's name was changed from "Ferd. Heye, Glas-Fabrik, Gerresheim bei Düsseldorf" into "Actien Gesellschaft der Gerresheimer Glashüttenwerke, vorm. Ferd. Heye, Gerresheim bei Düsseldorf". When Heye died in 1889, his son Hermann joined the company's management board aged 23 and was appointed as Board Chairman in 1891. In 1907, Hermann Heye founded "Europäischen Verband der Flaschenfabriken GmbH". The company purchased the patent rights to the Owens machine, the first fully automated bottling machine, for Europe. It was put into operation at Gerresheimer in 1908. Hermann remained at the helm of the company until his death in 1941. From then on, his son-in-law Niels von Bülow headed the company's management board as its oldest member. In 1959 the US company Owens-Illinois of Toledo (Ohio) acquired a 50.1% stake in Gerresheimer, followed by a majority shareholding in 1971. One year later, in 1972, the company name was changed to "Gerresheimer Glas AG". From November 1985 onwards, Gerresheimer Glas AG became an independent company again. The new majority shareholder was the Westdeutsche Landesbank (WestLB), which acquired around 58% of the shares in Gerresheimer Glas AG from Owens Illinois. VIAG acquired a majority shareholding in WestLB in 1990. In April 2000, when it merged with VEBA, VIAG sold its majority shareholding in Gerresheimer Glass AG to a consortium led by private equity investor Investcorp in order to fund the foundation of E.ON. This meant Gerresheimer Glas being de-listed from the stock exchange in 2003. The US investment group Blackstone bought the company at the end of 2004.

From the 1990s onwards, Gerresheimer underwent a gradual strategic reorientation. Gerresheimer had been one of the biggest European manufacturers of beer and water bottles. However, this division was spun off and the company shifted its focus to special packaging for the pharmaceutical, life sciences and cosmetics industries.

Gerresheimer Glas AG sold the Gerresheim glassworks and five other production plants to the French company BSN glasspack, a subsidiary of the French Danone Group, in 1999. Owens Illinois acquired BSN glasspack and thereby also the glassworks in Gerresheim in December 2004. In August 2005 the US company Owens Illinois (O-I) closed the Gerresheimer glassworks, formerly the world's largest bottle manufacturing facility. In the year 2012 Patrizia Immobilien acquired the site of the former glassworks. The Düsseldorf municipal authority and Patrizia Immobilien are implementing housing development projects in Düsseldorf's former glassmaking district.

=== Gerresheimer AG, 2007–present ===
The company was taken public (again) in June 2007 after its name had been shortened to Gerresheimer AG. It has been included in the German MDAX stock exchange index since December 2008. The company's headquarters remain in Düsseldorf.

In 2007 Gerresheimer AG bought the Wilden Group, later renamed Gerresheimer Regensburg GmbH and is part of the Medical Systems business unit in the Plastic & Devices division. In 2011 Gerresheimer acquired Brazilian company Tampas Herméticas Védat, which is now known as Gerresheimer Plásticos São Paulo Ltda. In April 2012 Gerresheimer acquired a majority shareholding in the Indian company Neutral Glass & Allied Industries Pvt. Ltd., followed by Triveni Polymers Ltd. Pvt., a plastic packaging manufacturer for the regulated Indian market, in December of the same year. The company operates five production facilities in South America, six in China, and seven in India.

In September 2015 Gerresheimer acquired Centor.

In November 2015 Gerresheimer sold its tubing operations to the US company Corning Inc. Gerresheimer and Corning have also set up a joint venture to accelerate innovations for the pharmaceutical glass packaging market.

Gerresheimer sold Kimble Chase, a joint venture with Chase Scientific Glass, Inc. based in Rockwood, Tennessee/USA, to the Duran Group, a portfolio company of One Equity Partners on November 1, 2016.

In July 2018 Gerresheimer bought the Swiss medical technology company Sensile Medical, a manufacturer of micropumps, and founded the new division Advanced Technologies.

Since the end of February 2019, 60% of Respimetrix has been owned by Gerresheimer AG. Respimetrix is located in the Advanced Technologies division and is active in the area of inhalation measurement.

In the first half of 2021, the plant in Skopje, the Republic of North Macedonia, was completed.

Sustainability is a key pillar of Gerresheimer's corporate strategy. In 2021, the company became a Signator of the United Nations Global Compact (UNCG), making it a member of the world's largest sustainability initiative. Concerning renewable energy, the company has set a goal: by 2030, 100% of the electricity consumption should come from renewable sources. The Gerresheimer site in Boleslawiec started using electricity from 100% renewable sources in 2021, from wind, solar, water and biomass sources. The company's carbon footprint was reduced by 13% compared to the base year.

With a strong focus on occupational safety, the accident rate was reduced by 36% in the 2021 financial year.

In the 2021 financial year, Gerresheimer was the world's leading manufacturer of vials with a volume of around 3.5 billion.

In December 2024, the company announced the acquisition of Blitz LuxCo Sarl, the parent of Bormioli Pharma Group, an Italian player focusing on primary pharmaceutical packaging (plastic and glass), expanding its production footprint in Europe.

In 2025, a consortium including KKR and Warburg Pincus submitted a non-binding bid for Gerresheimer AG.

== Locations ==
Gerresheimer has several operations around the world, including production plants at 47 locations in 16 countries in America, Asia and Europe.

== Key figures ==
Year	Revenues EUR m	Adjusted EBITDA	Net income EUR m	Employees
2008	1.060,1	206,4	4,5	10.177
2009	1.000,2	185,9	7,0	9.343
2010	1.024,8	204,5	46,7	9.475
2011	1.094,7	217,3	54,4	10.212
2012	1.219,1	239,9	68,3	10.952
2013	1.265,9	249,8	68,5	11.239
2014	1.290,0	253,4	72,9	11.096
2015	1.282,9	262,6	112,7	10.684
2016	1.375,5	307,8	168,2	9.904
2017	1.348,3	310,8	103,1	9.749
2018	1.367,7	298,6	103,0	9.890
2019	1.392,3	400,0	82,7	9.872
2020	1.418,8	310,1	89,9	9.880
2021	1.498,0	324,2	87,2	10.000
2022	1.817,1	354,2	102,2	11.062
2023	1.990,5	404,5	120,1	11.660

== Management board ==
Name	Division	Function	Since
Dietmar Siemssen	Plastics & Devices, Advanced Technologies	Chief Executive Officer	2018
Bernd Metzner		Chief Financial Officer	2019
Lukas Burkhardt	Primary Packaging Glass	Member of the Management Board	2018

== Literature ==
- Bruno Kammann: Gerresheimer Glas, Geschichte einer Weltfirma (1864–2000), Ein Beitrag zur Wirtschafts-, Sozial- und Stadtgeschichte Düsseldorfs, Klartext Verlag, Essen 2007 ISBN 978-3-89861-782-6.
- Peter Henkel: Industriepfad Düsseldorf. Düsseldorf 2009, ISBN 978-3-7700-1318-0.
- Peter Henkel: 150 Jahre Glashütte Gerresheim. Droste, Düsseldorf 2014, ISBN 978-3-7700-1533-7.

== See also ==
- Carbon Disclosure Project
