= Matthäus Hipp =

German clockmaker and inventor

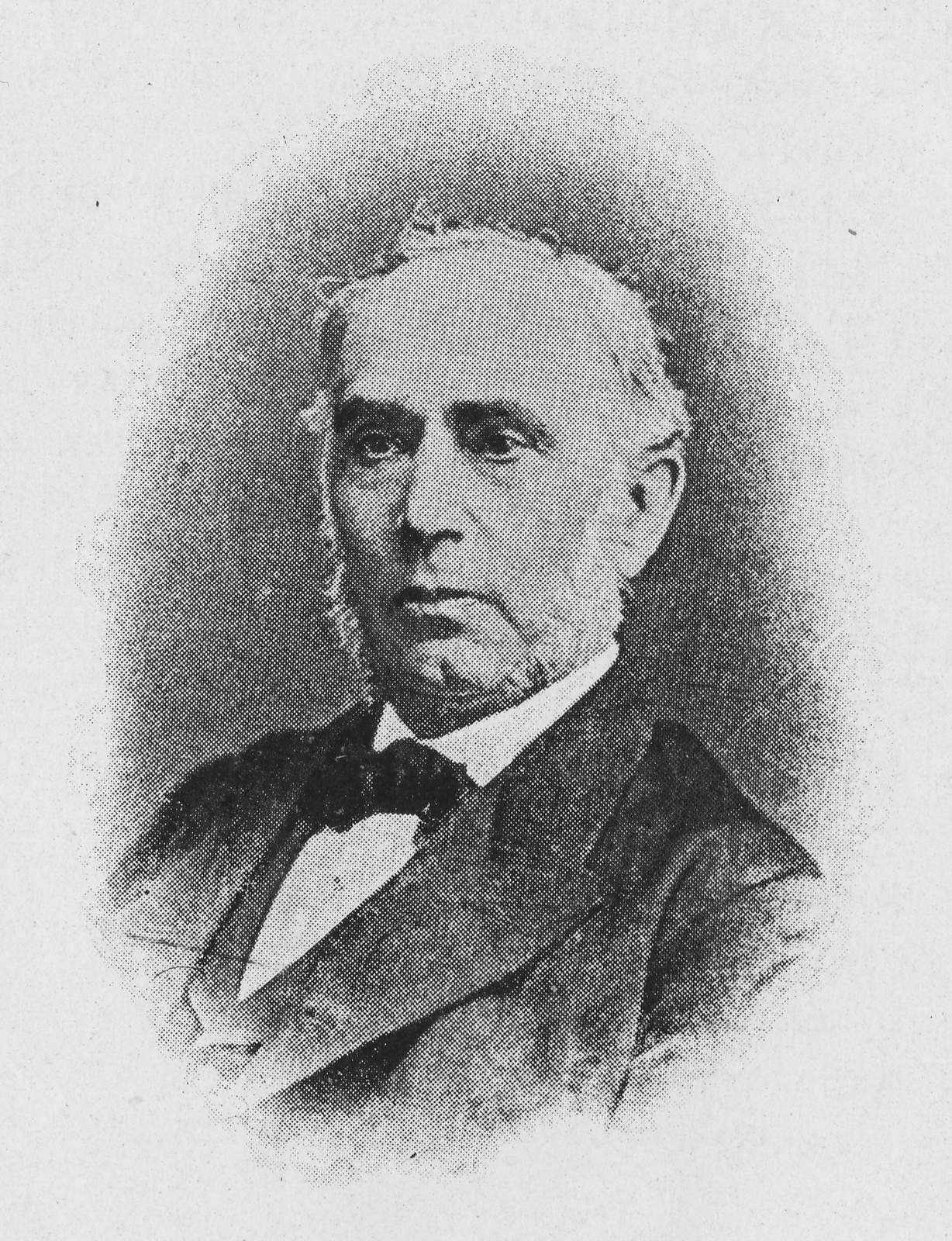
Matthäus Hipp

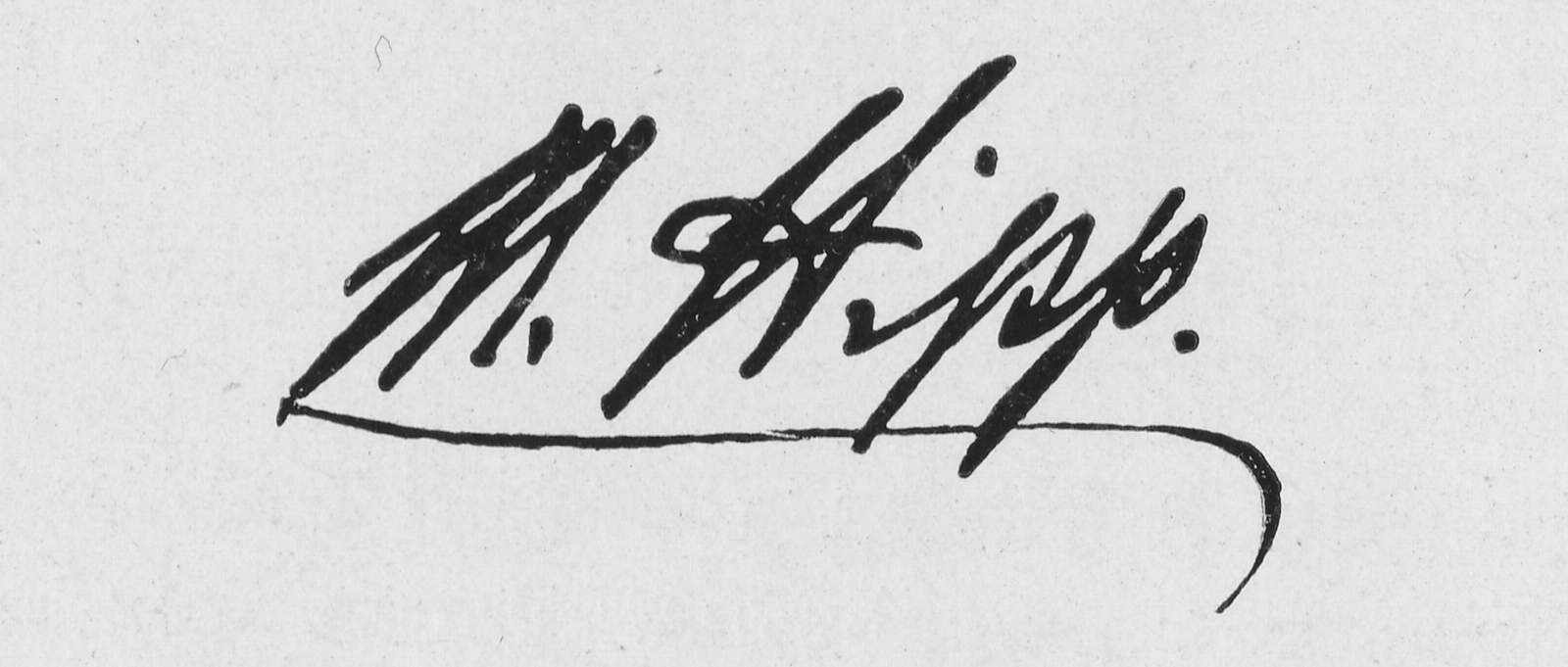
Unterschrift

Matthäus Hipp also spelled Matthias or Mathias (Blaubeuren, 25 October 1813 – 3 May 1893 in Fluntern) was a German clockmaker and inventor who lived from 1852 on in Switzerland. His most important, lastingly significant inventions were electrical looms, traffic signals, pendulum clocks, and the Hipp chronoscope.

== Biography ==
The son of Grain Miller at a monastery, Hipp was born 25 October 1813 in Blaubeuren, Württemberg. At the age of eight, he had an accident climbing on one of the many rocks there, and was lame for the rest of his life. At the age of sixteen, he became apprenticed to the clockmaker Johan Eichelhofer in his hometown of Blaubeuren. At the conclusion of his apprenticeship he began his Wanderjahre. In 1832 after working in Ulm for clockmaker Valentin Stoß, in 1834 he worked in the Swiss town of St. Gallen, afterwards between 1835 and 1837 in the clock factory Savoie in St. Aubin. In 1840, he moved to Reutlingen in Germany and opened a workshop there in 1841 at the age of 28. In the same year he married Johanna Plieninger, a teacher's daughter. The couple had four children.

After the suppressed revolution in Baden in the year 1849 his application for director of the clockmaker school in Furtwangen was rejected for political reasons, because he was regarded as a democrat. Consequently, in 1852, Hipp decided to leave Germany. He was appointed by the Swiss government as the director of the national telegraph workshop and technical director of the telegraph administration. Although Hipp's agreement explicitly allowed him to also continue working privately, when his privately derived income far exceeded his salary for public service, there arose conflicts with the Swiss administration and parliament. Hipp responded in 1860 by resigning from the Swiss government service.

The next part of his life career led him from Bern to Neuchâtel, where he took over the directorship of a newly established telegraph factory. Not until 1889 did Hipp relinquish management and hand over control of the company to the engineers A. Favarger and A. De Peyer. From then until 1908 the factory carried the logo "Peyer & Favarger, Succ. de M. Hipp".

Soon after his retirement he moved to Fluntern to be near his daughter in Zürich. On 3 May 1893, Matthäus Hipp died at the age of eighty in Fluntern. His wife outlived him by four years. Hipp, who since 1852 lived and worked in Switzerland, but never gave up his nationality, received the honorary name of "the Swiss Edison".

== Achievements ==
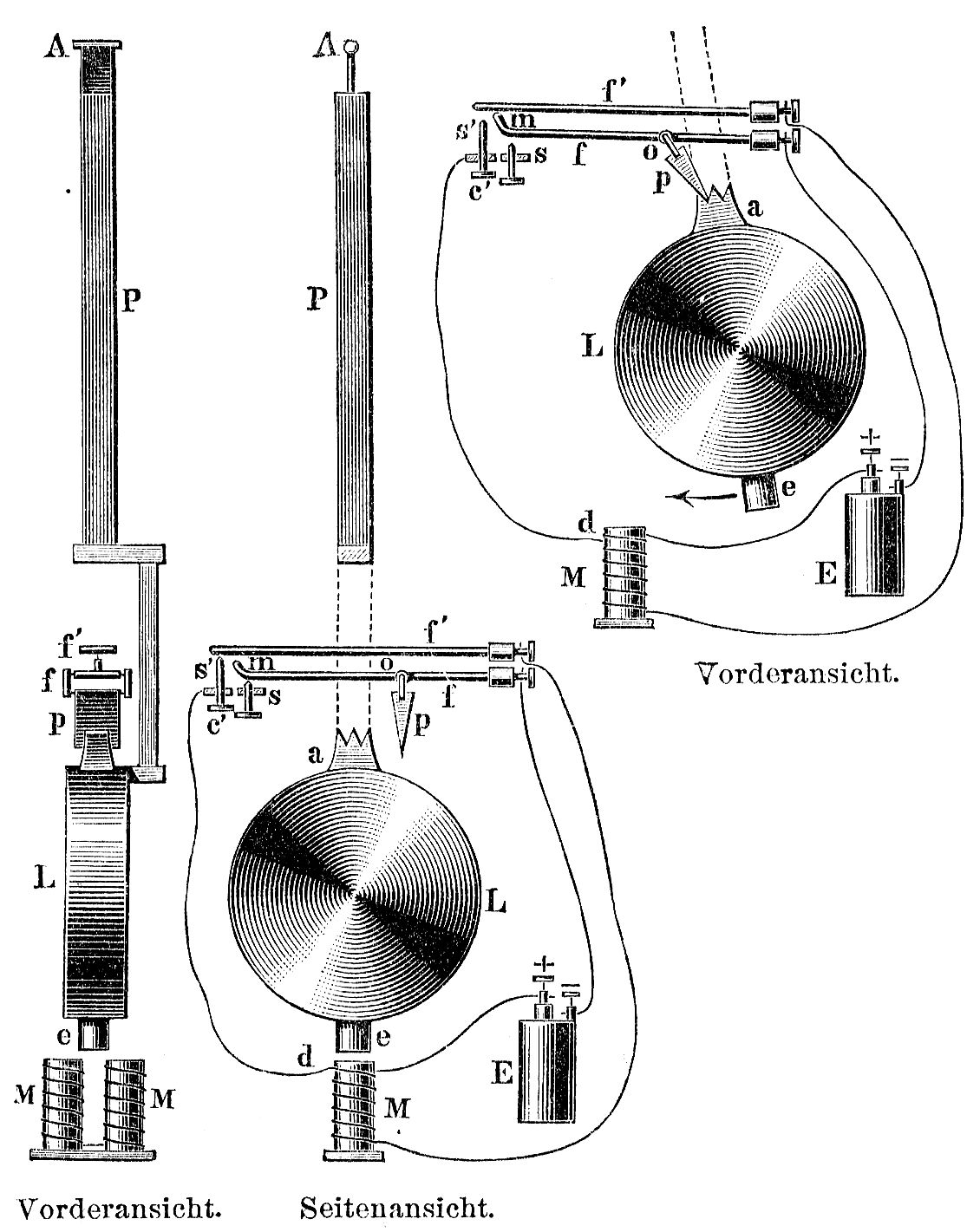
Hipp's electrical precision pendulum clock

Over the course of 40 years, Matthäus Hipp brought more than 20 inventions to technical maturity. Some of his inventions proved so good that for approximately one hundred years without changes in basic design these inventions could be manufactured and sold. For its time, Hipp's electrical pendulum clock was a technological breakthrough. His pallet escapement, later known as a 'Hipp toggle', helped to make electric clocks more reliable and was widely adapted into the twentieth century. His 'Chronoscope', a short duration timer pioneered in the 1840s, facilitated the first systematic study of human reaction times by Adolph Hirsch.

- 1843 description of a pendulum clock driven by a special escapement called "echappement à palette", later popularly known as a 'Hipp Toggle'.
- 1847 Chronoscope
- 1854 Two-way telegraphy on the same line
- 1855 Electrical loom
- 1856 Laid a cable of his own construction from Vierwaldstättersee to Flüelen
- 1862 Hipp's "Wendescheibe", an automatic visual railway signal
- 1862 Installed a clock system with an ultra-precise master clock and slave clocks in Geneva
- 1863 May 27 French patent for an electrical driven pendulum clock with Hipp toggle: "Pendule ou horloge électro-magnétique à appal direct d’électricité"

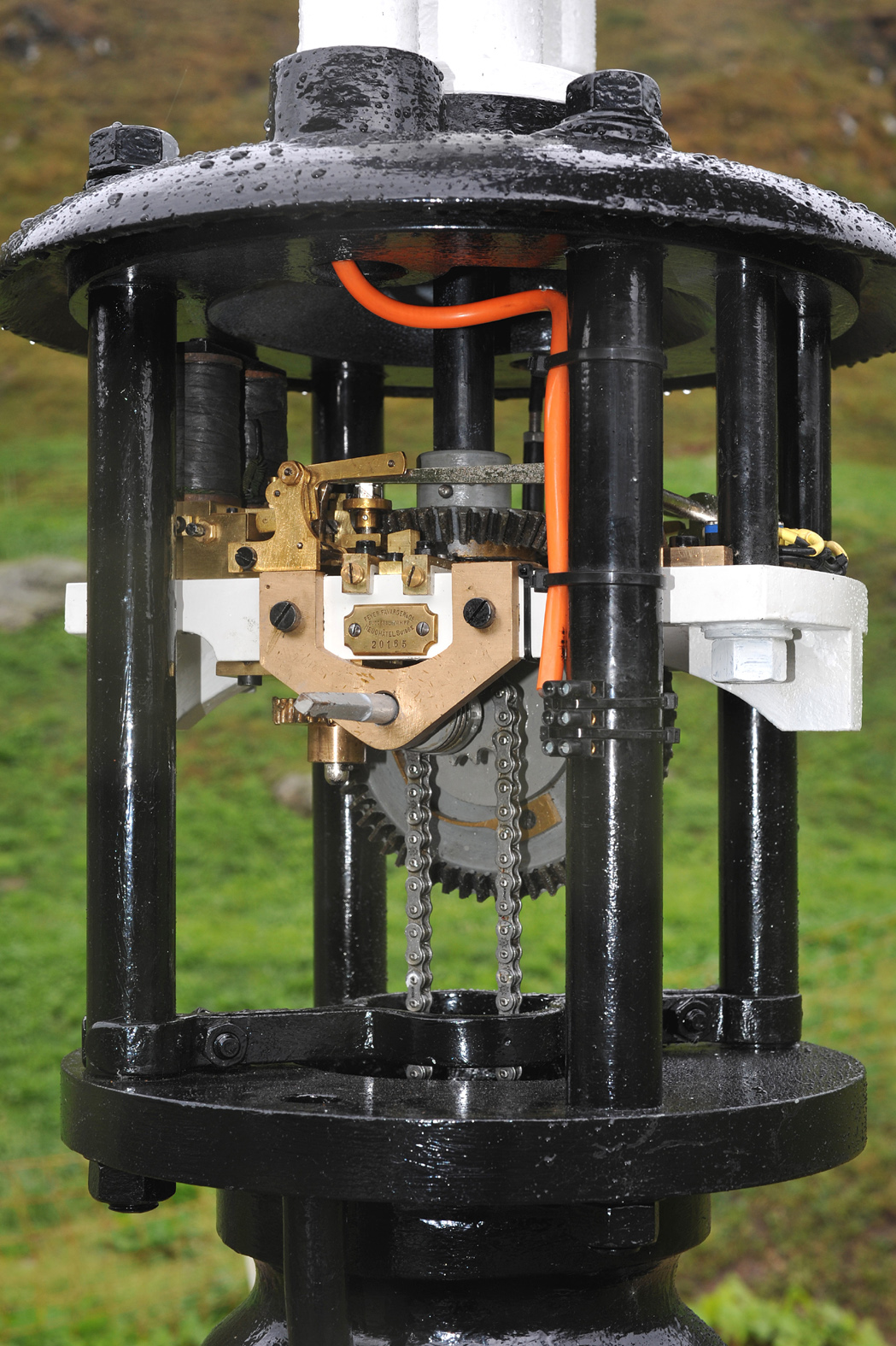
Drive mechanism of Hipp's Wendescheibe

- 1866 He developed in collaboration with Frédéric William Dubois an electrical Registrierchronographen with marine chronometer
- 1867 Electrical clavier
- 1874 He delivered to Vienna a chronograph for the observation of nerve activity
- 1881 High precision electrical observatory clock for the Observatoire Cantonal de Neuchâtel
- 1889 Registering speedometers

== Honours ==
- 1840 high Württemberg honour: „für sein im Uhrenbau neues, sinnreiches Prinzip zur Erzielung eines gleichformigen Pendelgangs“ (for his ingenious principle for the achievement of a homogeneous pendulum escapement, new in the building of clocks)
- 1873 Ritterkreuz of the Austrian Order of Franz Joseph
- 1875 Ehrendoktorwürde (Dr. phil. E. h.) from the Universität Zürich.
