= René Okle =

German footballer

Personal information
- Full name: René Okle
- Date of birth: 1 January 1983 (age 43)
- Place of birth: Blaubeuren, West Germany
- Height: 1.79 m (5 ft 10 in)
- Position: Defender

Youth career
- TSV Seissen
- SSV Ulm

Senior career*
Years	Team	Apps	(Gls)
2002–2004	SSV Ulm	59	(12)
2004–2009	VfR Aalen	73	(3)
2009–2010	SpVgg Weiden	24	(2)
- * Club domestic league appearances and goals

René Okle (born 1 January 1983) is a German former footballer who played as a defender.
