= TecDAX =

Stock index of the 30 largest German technology companies

- Logo
- Foundation: 24 March 2003
- Operator: STOXX (Qontigo, Deutsche Börse)
- Exchanges: Frankfurt Stock Exchange
- Constituents: 30
- Type: Mid-cap, technology sector
- Market cap: €10.718 billion (2009)
- Weighting method: Capitalization-weighted
- Related indices: DAX, MDAX, SDAX
- Website: TecDAX homepage

The TecDAX stock index tracks the performance of the 30 largest German companies from the technology sector. In terms of order book turnover and market capitalization the companies rank below those included in the DAX.

The TecDax was introduced on 24 March 2003. It succeeded the NEMAX50 (Neuer Markt — new market) stock index of German new economy companies that existed from 1997 to 2003 and was discontinued after extreme value loss due to the burst of the dot-com bubble.

TecDAX is based on prices generated in Xetra. The index is calculated on every trading day, between 9 am and 5.30 pm CET .

In 2018, the TecDAX had an average performance of 23,3 % in five years, outpacing even the NASDAQ.

== Companies ==
The following 30 companies make up the index as of the quarterly review effective February 2024.

- 1&1 Drillisch
- Adtran
- Aixtron
- Atoss Software SE
- Bechtle
- Cancom SE
- Carl Zeiss Meditec
- CompuGroup Medical SE
- Deutsche Telekom
- Energiekontor
- Evotec
- Freenet
- Hensoldt
- Infineon Technologies
- Jenoptik
- Kontron
- MorphoSys
- Nagarro SE
- Nemetschek
- Nordex
- PNE AG
- Qiagen
- SAP
- Sartorius
- Siemens Healthineers
- Siltronic
- SMA Solar Technology
- TeamViewer
- United Internet
- Verbio

== See also ==
- DAX
- MDAX
- SDAX
- ÖkoDAX
