= TeamViewer =

Remote administration and web conferencing software

- TeamViewer Remote 16.1 on Windows 11
- Developer: TeamViewer SE

Stable release(s) [±]
- Windows: 15.80.4 / July 28, 2026; 3 months ago
- macOS: 15.80.4 / July 28, 2026; 3 months ago
- Linux: 15.80.4 / July 28, 2026; 3 months ago
- Web: 15.80.4 / July 28, 2026; 3 months ago
- Android (Note: Including ChromeOS): 15.80.207 / July 28, 2026; 3 months ago
- iOS: 15.80.1 / July 28, 2026; 3 months ago
- Windows (UWP-only, discontinued): 15.53.6 / April 15, 2024; 2 years ago
- Operating system: Windows, macOS, Linux, Android, iOS/iPadOS
- Type: Remote administration, Web conferencing
- License: Proprietary software
- Website: www.teamviewer.com

TeamViewer is a remote access and remote control computer software, allowing maintenance of computers and other devices. It was first released in 2005, and its functionality has expanded step by step. TeamViewer is proprietary software that requires registration and is free of charge for non-commercial use. It has been installed on more than 2.5 billion devices. TeamViewer is the core product of developing company TeamViewer SE.

== History ==
The foundation of TeamViewer goes back to the release of the first version of the TeamViewer software in 2005, which was developed to reduce travelling to customers and at that time was still based on the VNC project. The IT service provider wanted to avoid unnecessary trips to customers and perform tasks such as installing software remotely. The development was very successful and gave rise to TeamViewer GmbH, which today operates as TeamViewer Germany GmbH and is part of TeamViewer SE.

== Operating systems ==
TeamViewer is available for most desktop computers with common operating systems, including Microsoft Windows and Windows Server, as well as Apple's macOS. There are also packages for several Linux distributions and derivatives, for example, Debian, Ubuntu, Red Hat, and Fedora Linux. Besides, there is Raspberry Pi OS, a Debian variant for the Raspberry Pi.

TeamViewer is also available for smartphones and tablets running Android or Apple's iOS/iPadOS operating system, with very limited functionality on Linux based operating systems. Support for Windows Phone and Windows Mobile has been phased out after Microsoft discontinued support for the two operating systems.

== Functionality ==
The functionality of TeamViewer differs depending on the device and variant or version of the software. The core of TeamViewer is remote access to computers and other endpoints as well as their control and maintenance. After the connection is established, the remote screen is visible to the user at the other endpoint. Both endpoints can send and receive files as well as access a shared clipboard, for example. Besides, some functions facilitate team collaboration, such as audio and video transmissions via IP telephony.

In recent years, the functionality of the software has been optimized in particular for use in large companies. For this purpose, the enterprise variant TeamViewer Tensor was developed. With TeamViewer Frontline, TeamViewer sells software for remote support and process optimization with augmented reality elements. TeamViewer offers interfaces to other applications and services, for example from Microsoft (Teams), Salesforce, The solution is available in nearly all countries and supports over 30 languages.

In October 2024, Session Insights was launched, an AI-based feature that automates the documentation of remote support sessions by automatically generating summaries after each session. In autumn 2025, TeamViewer consolidated these and other functions under the TeamViewer AI label. This add-on includes, in addition to Session Insights & Analytics, TeamViewer Tia, an AI-agent integrated into remote support sessions for retrieving device data, analysing issues and automating standardised processes. Session Insights & Analytics also provides keyword search and metric overviews in dashboards.

== License policy ==
Private customers may use a limited subset of features for non-commercial purposes free of charge. There is a maximum of three managed devices for free accounts. VPN, Wake-on-LAN, file sync, audio, video and chat were disabled. Fees must be paid for the commercial use of the software. Companies and other commercial customers must sign up for a subscription. The prices for using the software are scaled according to the number of users as well as the number of concurrent sessions. Updates are released monthly and are included for all users.

Since 2021, complimentary TeamViewer 15 access for legacy versions has been deprecated. Since 2023, a one-time purchase of the application is no longer possible. TeamViewer was contacting some users to try to have them convert their perpetual license to the subscription model. For cancellation of the annual subscriptions, it must be done within 28 days of subscribing to the service or upon the renewal of the license. This was criticized, but challenges were rejected by federal courts in California; the courts held that the auto-renewal was sufficient under California law.

== Security ==
Incoming and outgoing connections are equally possible via the Internet or local networks. If desired, TeamViewer can run as a Windows system service, which allows unattended access via TeamViewer. There is also a portable version of the software that runs completely without installation, for example via a USB data carrier.

The connection is established using automatically generated unique IDs and passwords. Before each connection, the TeamViewer network servers check the validity of the IDs of both endpoints. Security is enhanced by the fingerprint, which allows users to provide additional proof of the remote device's identity. Passwords are protected against brute force attacks, especially by increasing the waiting time between connection attempts exponentially. TeamViewer provides additional security features, such as two-factor authentication, block and allow lists.

Before establishing a connection, TeamViewer first checks the configuration of the device and the network to detect restrictions imposed by firewalls and other security systems. Usually, a direct TCP/UDP connection can be established so that no additional ports need to be opened. Otherwise, TeamViewer falls back on other paths such as an HTTP tunnel.

Regardless of the connection type selected, data is transferred exclusively via secure data channels. TeamViewer includes end-to-end encryption based on RSA (4096 bits) and AES (256 bits). According to the manufacturer, man-in-the-middle attacks are principally not possible. This is to be guaranteed by the signed key exchange of two key pairs.

== Abuse ==
=== Support scam ===
TeamViewer and similar programs can be abused for technical support scams. In this process, attackers pretend to be employees of well-known companies to gain control over their victims' computers. They then use a pretext to obtain money from their victims. For this reason, the British Internet provider TalkTalk permanently blocked the software's data traffic. TeamViewer condemns all forms of misuse of the software, provides tips for safe use, and provides a way to investigate corresponding incidents.

=== Account access ===
In June 2016, hundreds of TeamViewer users reported having their computers accessed by an unauthorized address in China and bank accounts misappropriated. TeamViewer stated it was "appalled by any criminal activity" but attributed the outcome to "careless use, not a potential security breach on TeamViewer's side", saying "neither was TeamViewer hacked nor is there a security hole, TeamViewer is safe to use and has proper security measures in place. Our evidence points to careless use as the cause of the reported issue; a few extra steps will prevent potential abuse."

In June 2024, TeamViewer reported that it was the target of an attack by the Russian hacker group APT29. The intrusion into the IT infrastructure of the company, using a standard employee's credentials, was detected on 26 June 2024. TeamViewer's security team, along with external cybersecurity experts, immediately launched an investigation. According to Heise online, TeamViewer disclosed that the attack was confined to the corporate IT environment without affecting client data or product systems.

== See also ==
- Comparison of remote desktop software
- Remote desktop software
