= LEG Immobilien =

LEG Immobilien SE
- Company type: Societas Europaea
- Traded as: FWB: LEG; MDAX Component
- ISIN: DE000LEG1110
- Industry: Real estate
- Founded: 22 June 1970; 55 years ago
- Headquarters: Düsseldorf, Germany
- Area served: North Rhine-Westphalia
- Key people: Lars von Lackum (CEO); Kathrin Köhling (CFO); Dr. Volker Wiegel (COO); Michael Zimmer (Chairman of the supervisory board)
- Revenue: ▲€1.47 billion (2025)
- Number of employees: ▲1,789 (2025)
- Website: leg-wohnen.de

LEG Immobilien SE (formerly Landesentwicklungsgesellschaft) is a German property company. As of 2025, it is a constituent of the MDAX trading index of German mid-cap companies.

The company was established as a housing provider operating in the German Land of North Rhine-Westphalia. It was privatized in 2008 and has operated since 2013 as a publicly traded company. The headquarters is located in Düsseldorf, the Land capital (Landeshauptstadt) of North Rhine-Westphalia. In August 2020, the company changed its legal form from Aktiengesellschaft to Societas Europaea.

As of year-end 2025, the company has around 1,800 employees and holds around 171,360 apartments and properties. A takeover bid by Deutsche Wohnen failed in 2015. In December 2021, the company significantly expanded its portfolio by acquiring around 15,400 apartments from the Adler Group.

== Dividends ==
The following table shows the dividend distributions for the last ten years:

Payment date	Dividend (€)	Yield (%)
May 2017	2.76	3.28 %
May 2018	3.04	3.31 %
June 2019	3.53	3.26 %
September 2020	3.60	2.96 %
June 2021	3.78	3.06 %
June 2022	4.07	4.98 %
January 2023	0.00	0.00 %
May 2024	2.45	3.00 %
May 2025	5.40	7.26 %
May 2026	2.92	4.86 %
