= LinuxUser =

German computer magazine for Linux

- Logo
- Editor: Jörg Luther
- Frequency: Monthly
- Circulation: 13,500 (2017)
- Publisher: Computec Media Group
- Founded: 2000
- Country: Germany
- Based in: Munich
- Language: German
- Website: www.linux-community.de
- ISSN: 1615-4444

LinuxUser is a German computer magazine for Linux users published by German media company Medialinx AG. It was first published in 2000.
