= Vem (given name) =

Vem is a given name. Notable people with the given name include:

- Vem Narender Reddy (born 1960), Indian politician
