= CompuGroup Medical =

Software company based in Germany

CompuGroup Medical SE & Co. KGaA
- Type: Societas Europaea
- Traded as: SDAX
- ISIN: DE000A288904
- Industry: Software
- Founded: 1984; 42 years ago
- Headquarters: Koblenz, Germany
- Revenue: €1.2 billion (2023)
- Number of employees: 9,254 (2023)
- Website: www.cgm.com

CompuGroup Medical SE & Co. KGaA (also known as CGM) is a German publicly listed software company based in Koblenz that develops and offers software for the healthcare sector. It produces cloud-based and digital application software to support medical and organizational activities in doctors' practices, pharmacies, medical laboratories and hospitals. According to its own figures, the company employed more than 9,200 people worldwide in 2022, and has over 1.6 million users in 56 countries. CompuGroup Medical shares have been included in the TecDAX stock market index since September 2013. The company delisted on June 24, 2025, after CVC Capital Partners took a ~28% stake in the company. Majority shareholder remains the founding family Gotthardt with ~50%.

The company is a worldwide provider of healthcare software and has, in particular, maintained market leadership in Germany within the outpatient sector for several years with its various practice management systems (PVS).

== History ==
In 1984, Jürgen Riebling, Peter Kirchdorfer, Ursula Spitta, Max-Georg Prahl and Walter Schäfer founded Compudent GmbH, which became a public company in 1986. In 1992, Frank Gotthardt took over all the ordinary shares and merged Compudent with his company "Gotthardt Computer GmbH" in Koblenz, whereby the name "Compudent AG" was retained. Initially, dental information systems were offered, followed by software in 1993. In 1997, the company was renamed Compugroup Holding AG.

In 2004, the company entered the Czech Republic with doctor information systems for registered doctors and dentists. In the Czech Republic, Slovakia and Poland the company soon entered the field of hospital information systems. The company also developed information systems for physicians in France, Spain and Italy. In Germany, several products were added to the portfolio: medical archiving, hospital information systems, multimedia communication services, drug information systems, laboratory information systems, a referring physician portal and administration software. In addition, web-based patient files were launched and intelligent assistance systems for doctors were developed.

The company expanded its operations in Austria, achieving market leadership in hospital information systems and information systems for doctors in private practice, as well as for acute care, rehabilitation, and social facilities. In Turkey, the company entered the market for doctor, hospital, and health insurance software. Its presence extended to Scandinavia, Africa, and Asia, acquiring customers in the sectors of private medical practice, hospitals, and laboratories. In the United States, the company also initiated activities in doctor information systems and web-based patient records. In the Netherlands, it entered the market for doctor and pharmacy information systems.

In order to realize plans for internationalization, the owner decided in 1997 to change the name from Compudent AG to CompuGroup AG, which was implemented around the turn of the millennium. In 2010, the CompuGroup Holding was renamed CompuGroup Medical and merged with the subsidiaries that had been created in the meantime under this umbrella brand. In 2016, the transition from a stock corporation under German law to a Societas Europaea under European law took place.

In February 2020, CompuGroup Medical announced that it had signed a purchase agreement for part of the IT healthcare portfolio of healthcare software company Cerner in Germany and Spain. The main products of the acquired portfolio are medico and Soarian Integrated Care, leading hospital information systems in Germany, Selene, a hospital information system in Spain.

On 31 December 2020, founder and Chief Executive Officer (CEO) Frank Gotthardt resigned from his position and assumed the role of Chairman of the Board of Directors. Prof. (apl.) Dr. med. Daniel Gotthardt, son of the company founder, has been CEO since September 1, 2024. He has also been a member of the company's Supervisory Board since 2003 and a member of the Board of Directors since 2020.

In January 2024 Germany moved to electronic prescriptions at most GP practices. Since this nationwide change, it was reported that 30 percent of all German e-presecriptions were issued via CGM's hardware and software.

== Operations ==
In 2017, the company had around 4,600 employees at locations in 19 countries: Austria, Belgium, the Czech Republic, Denmark, France, Germany, Italy, Malaysia, the Netherlands, Norway, Poland, Romania, Slovakia, South Africa, Spain, Sweden, Switzerland and the USA. It is one of the leading international providers of software for the healthcare sector. The company is headquartered in Koblenz. The majority of central software development is also based here.

== Key personnel ==
=== Board of directors ===
- Frank Gotthardt (Chairman)
- Prof. Dr. Daniel Gotthardt (CEO)
- Daniela Hommel
- Emanuele Mugnani
- Hannes Reichl
- Dr. Ulrich Thomé, Managing Director of Outpatient Information Systems (DACH)

== Collaborations ==
The company is participating in a collaborative project with five other healthcare entities, funded by the Ministry of Labour, Health and Social Affairs of North Rhine-Westphalia (Arzneimittelkonto NRW), aimed at enhancing drug therapy safety (AMTS).

Moreover, CompuGroup Medical has established a "Software Engineering in Healthcare" course in partnership with Koblenz University of Applied Sciences for students. It also supports a newly established dual study program in collaboration with Niederrhein University of Applied Sciences.
