= Sulzemoos =

- Municipality
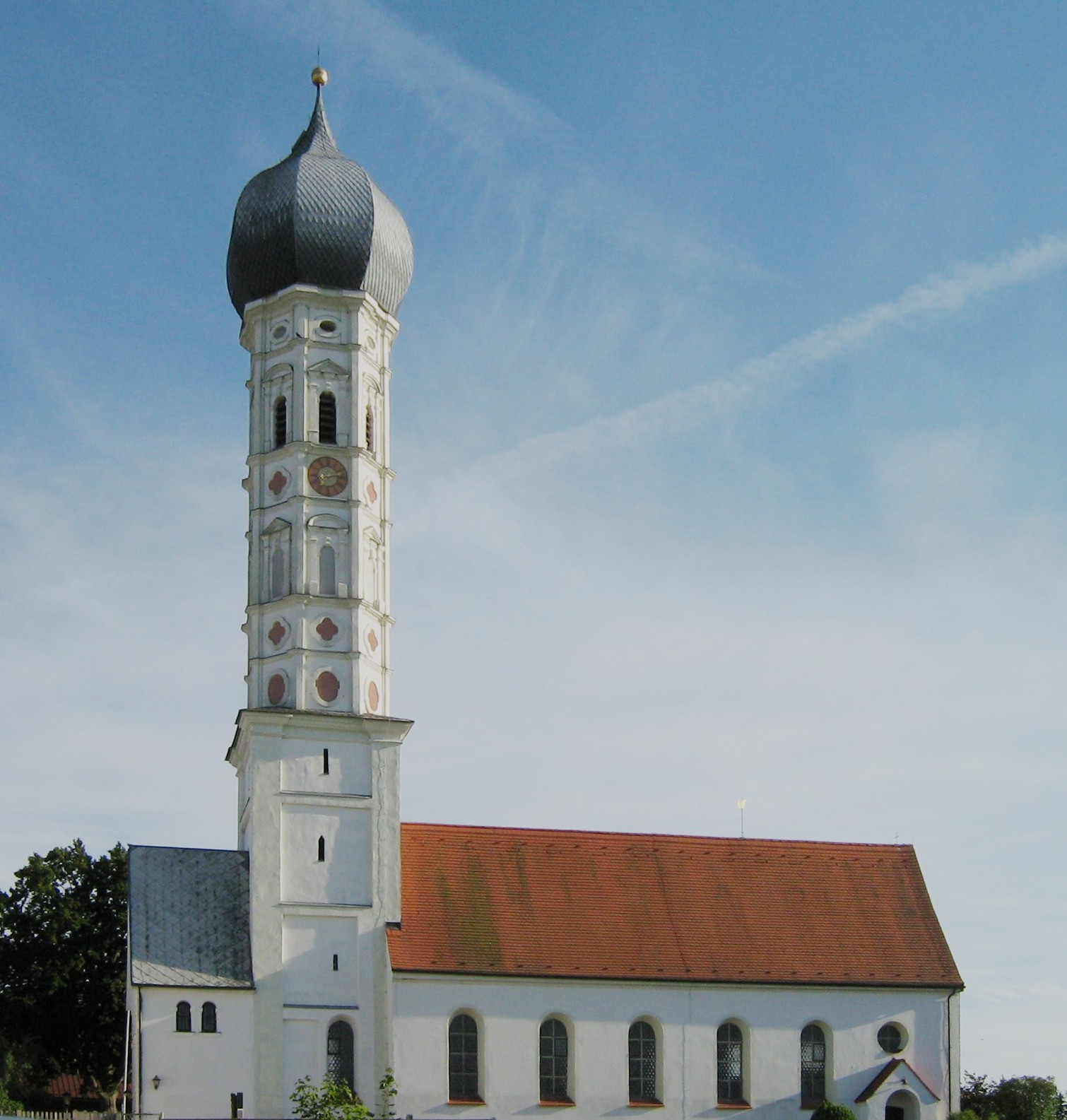
- Saint Florian Church

- Coat of arms

- Location of Sulzemoos within Dachau district
- Interactive map of Sulzemoos
- Location within Germany Location within Bavaria
- Coordinates: 48°16′N 11°16′E
- Country: Germany
- State: Bavaria
- Admin. region: Oberbayern
- District: Dachau
- Subdivisions: 10 Ortsteile

Government
  - Mayor (2020–26): Johannes Kneidl

Area
  - Total: 19.04 km^{2} (7.35 sq mi)
- Elevation: 504 m (1,654 ft)

Population (2025-12-31)
  - Total: 2,841
  - Density: 149.2/km^{2} (386.5/sq mi)
- Time zone: UTC+01:00 (CET)
  - Summer (DST): UTC+02:00 (CEST)
- Postal codes: 85254
- Dialling codes: 08135
- Vehicle registration: DAH
- Website: www.sulzemoos.de

Sulzemoos is a municipality in the district of Dachau in Bavaria in Germany.
