= Karl Philipp Conz =

German poet (1762–1827)

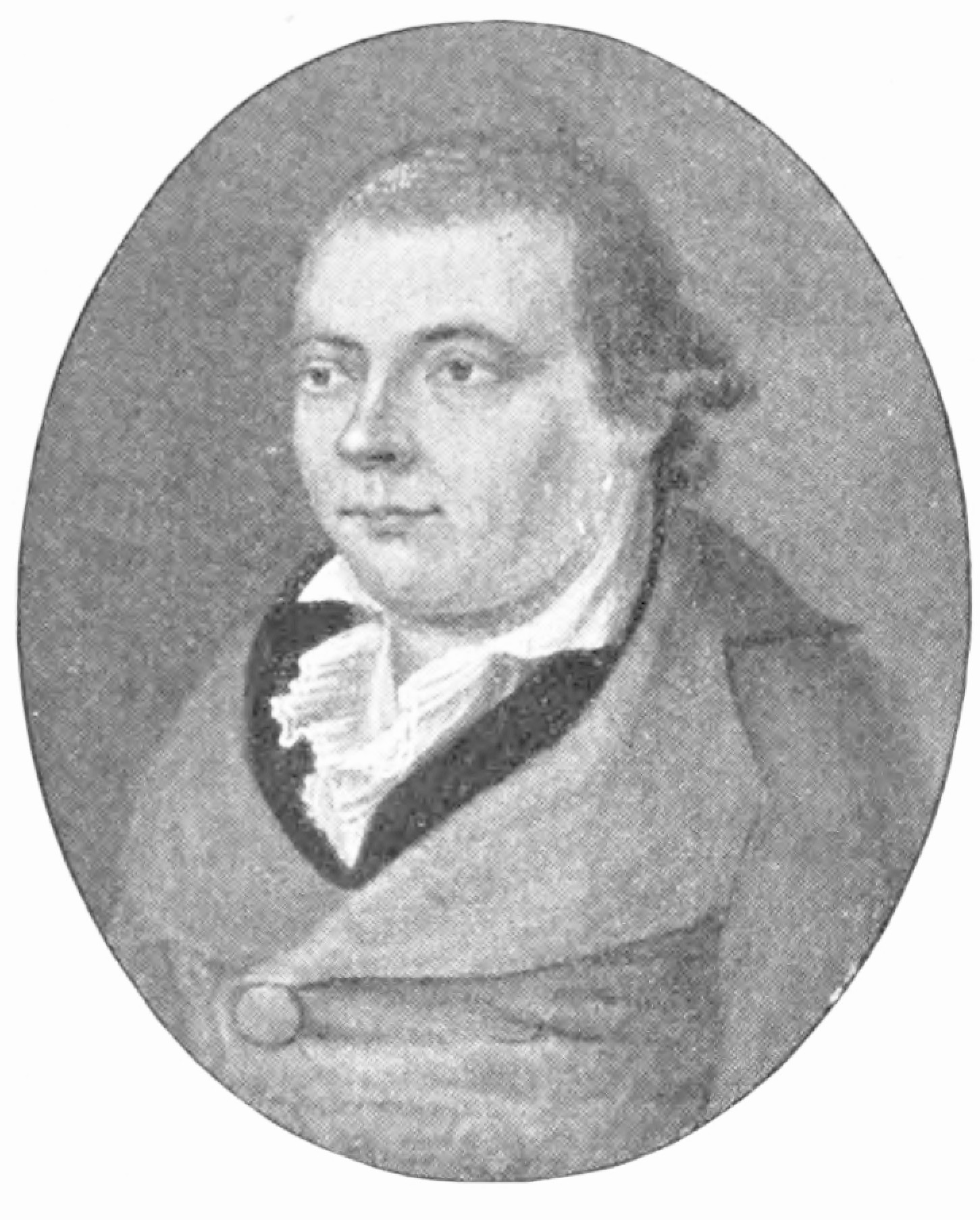
image of Karl Philipp Conz

Karl Philipp Conz (28 October 1762 – 20 June 1827) was a German poet.
