= Carl Zeiss Meditec =

German medical company

Carl Zeiss Meditec AG
- Company type: Public subsidiary
- Traded as: FWB: AFX; MDAX
- Industry: Health care
- Founded: 2002; 24 years ago
- Headquarters: Jena, Germany
- Key people: Andreas Pecher (Chairman of the supervisory board); Maximilian Foerst (President and CEO); Justus Felix Wehmer (CFO)
- Products: Medical lasers, ophthalmic diagnostic equipment, surgical microscopes, intraoperative radiation therapy equipment
- Revenue: €1.65 billion (2021)
- Number of employees: 3,531
- Parent: Carl Zeiss AG
- Website: zeiss.com/meditec

Carl Zeiss Meditec AG is a multinational medical technology company. Headquartered in Jena, Germany, the company operates as part of the larger Carl Zeiss Group. Doing business as ZEISS Medical Technology, the company develops and manufactures solutions for ophthalmology, dentistry, oncology, neurosurgery, microsurgery, and other medical applications.

== History ==
Founded in 2002, ZEISS Medical Technology employs thousands of professionals worldwide and maintains a presence in dozens of countries around the world.

In 2025, the parent company, Carl Zeiss Group, marked 100 years in the United States.

In October 2018, Carl Zeiss Meditec won FDA premarket approval for its ReLEx Smile laser system.

Also in October 2018, Carl Zeiss Meditec announced the acquisition of Reno, Nevada-based IanTech for an undisclosed sum.

In September 2019, Carl Zeiss Meditec launched the CIRRUS 6000 at the European Society of Retina Specialists 2019 Congress.
