= List of medical abbreviations: J =

Sortable table
Abbreviation	Meaning
JCV	JC virus (named after the initials of an anonymous patient)
JEV	Japanese encephalitis virus
JIA	juvenile idiopathic arthritis
JMML	juvenile myelomonocytic leukemia
JMS	junior medical student, aka MS-3
JODM	juvenile-onset diabetes mellitus
JP; JPD; JPDs	Jackson-Pratt drain
JRA	juvenile rheumatoid arthritis (now called juvenile idiopathic arthritis)
JVD	jugular venous distension
JVP	jugular venous pressure
