= PNE AG =

- Type: Public company
- Traded as: SDAX: PNE3
- ISIN: DE000A0JBPG2
- Industry: Renewable energy
- Founded: 1995
- Headquarters: Cuxhaven, Germany
- Key people: Heiko Wuttke (CEO); Dirk Simons (CFO); Roland Stanze (COO); Marcel Egger (Chairman of the Supervisory Board)
- Revenue: € 121 million (2023)
- Number of employees: 632 (2023)
- Website: www.pnegroup.com

PNE AG (formerly Plambeck Neue Energie AG) is a German company based in Cuxhaven that develops wind farms on land and at sea (offshore).

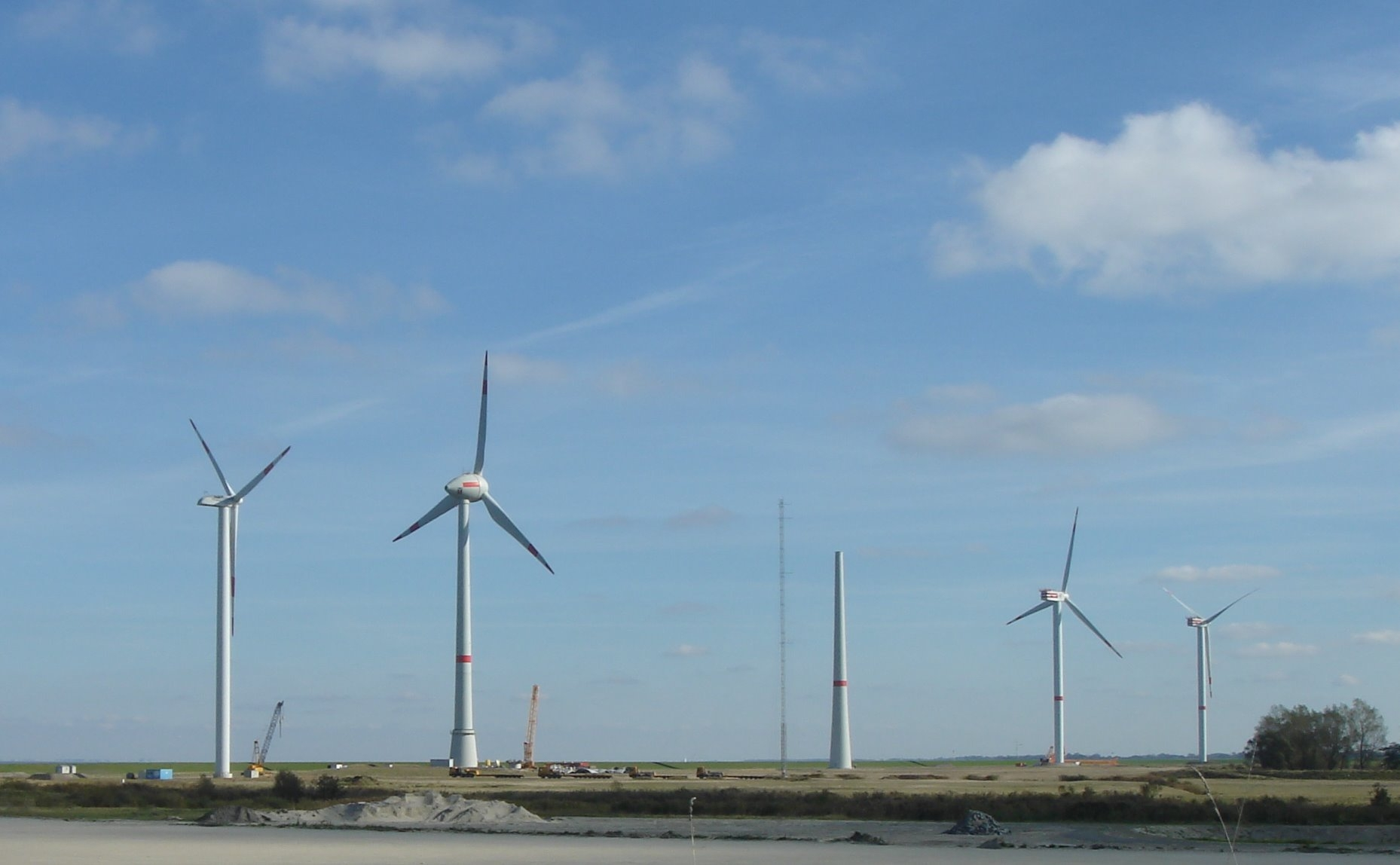
Wind farm in Cuxhaven, in order to test offshore farms

The business model of PNE AG includes planning, building, financing, operating and selling of wind farms. Besides Germany, the company is also active in Hungary, France, Turkey and USA.

The company received the permission for the first own offshore project "Borkum Reef Ground" approximately four years after examination by the competent Bundesamt für Seeschifffahrt und Hydrographie (Federal Maritime and Hydrographic Agency) in February 2004. In August 2006 the construction of the offshore wind farm "Gode Wind I" was permitted. The permission for the offshore wind farm "Gode Wind II" was granted in July 2009. Thus, the company may set up approximately 160 wind turbines in the North Sea with a total capacity of up to 637 MW. Another offshore wind farm "Gode Wind III" is in development and has been sold along with the wind farm Gode Wind I-II to the Danish energy company DONG Energy.

Until December 2010 PNE had built 97 onshore wind farms with 563 wind turbines and a total capacity of 804 MW. 299 wind turbines with a total capacity of 462 MW and 2 biogas plants with a total of 1 MW were in the operational management.

== History ==
In 1979, Norbert Plambeck and his father Otto Plambeck founded a group of companies. This group included the "Windpark Marschland GmbH" in 1995, which changed its name in 1998 to Plambeck Neue Energien AG as a company limited by shares (Aktiengesellschaft).

For more than 30 years, it has been a been an experience for project developers in the area of onshore and offshore wind farms. The focus is on the development of wind energy and photovoltaic projects worldwide as well as on power generation with its own wind farms. Its portfolio covers all project planning phases, from site investigation, approval procedures and financing through to construction, operation and repowering. As a Clean Energy Solutions Provider, the PNE Group also offers services for the entire life cycle of wind farms and photovoltaic power plants, as well as battery storage solutions for more efficient use of renewable energies. The PNE Group is a sought-after partner for industry when it comes to solutions for refining electricity using Power-to-X technologies.

Wolfgang von Geldern accompanied Norbert Plambeck during the Initial public offering and belonged to the Board from 1998 until 2008.

PNE AG is listed at the SDAX with stock ticker PNE3.DE. In August 2019 Morgan Stanley Infrastructure announced an offer at €4 per share or €306m to acquire PNE AG. The supervisory board of PNE AG agreed to the offer in October 2019. A great number of PNE AG's shareholders disagreed with the offer, sighting the offer as too low. As of November 15th 2019 Morgan Stanley Infrastructure amassed a 21.9% stake in PNE AG.

In January 2026, PNE AG sold 6 wind farm projects to Spanish company Qualitas Energy. These projects included three under construction wind farms: the "Helenenberg" wind farm with a capacity of 6 MW in Rhineland-Palatinate, the "Welsche Lied" wind farm with a total capacity of 27.8 MW in Hesse and the "Zinndorf" wnd farm with a capacity of 6.8 MW in Brandenburg; and three wind farms in Hessen "Großer Mittelberg" (4.2 MW), "Herzhausen" (33 MW) and "Odensachsen" (13.2 MW).
