= General Standard =

Market segment of the Frankfurt Stock Exchange

General Standard is a market segment of the Frankfurt Stock Exchange.

Companies which belong to General Standard have to fulfill minimum requirements in terms of transparency regulated by law. Stock issuers with a focus on national German markets are appropriate to General Standard. To be listed in the leading German stock index DAX companies have to fulfill higher standards. These belong to Prime Standard.
