= Verbio =

German biochemicals company

Verbio SE
- Formerly: Verbio Vereinigte Bioenergie AG
- Company type: Societas Europaea
- Traded as: FWB: VBK; SDAX
- ISIN: DE000A0JL9W6
- Industry: Biofuel
- Founded: 2006
- Founder: Claus Sauter
- Headquarters: Zörbig, Germany
- Key people: Claus Sauter, CEO
- Revenue: EUR 1.986 million (2022)
- Number of employees: 1,180 (2022)
- Website: verbio.de/en

Verbio SE, based in Zörbig, Germany, is a company that produces biofuels and chemical products from rapeseed oil, rye, wheat, triticale, maize and straw. Administration and management are located in Leipzig, Germany. The company employs 1,180 people and has sites in Germany, India, the United States, Canada, Poland and Hungary.

== History ==
Claus Sauter took over the management of the agricultural trading company Alois Sauter Landesprodukten-Großhandlung in Obenhausen, Bavaria from his father in 1990. In 1991, after the German reunification, expansion into the eastern German states (former GDR) began with the acquisition and development of agricultural and commodities trading companies. In 1995, Sauter produced biodiesel for his own use for the first time. In 2000, he built a transesterification plant in Bitterfeld, Saxony-Anhalt with his business partner Georg Pollert. This was followed by a bioethanol plant in Zörbig, which went into operation in 2004, and two production plants for biodiesel and bioethanol in Schwedt, Brandenburg. Together with the St. Gallen-based trading and plant construction company Swiss Bioenergie, the four production companies and sites of the Sauter Group were merged under the new umbrella company Verbio Vereinigte Bioenergie AG in May 2006. Sauter became its Chairman of the Board, and shareholders included himself, Pollert, two siblings and Claus Sauter's wife. The group employed around 300 people.

In the fall of 2006, Verbio announced its IPO for October. The proceeds were to be used to repay state subsidies and expand production.

The company's shares were listed on the Frankfurt Stock Exchange with effect from October 16, 2006. In the same year, the Sauter family acquired significant shares in the agricultural trading company Märka GmbH in Eberswalde, Brandenburg through its family holding Sauter Verpachtungsgesellschaft GmbH. In 2009, construction began on biogas plants in Zörbig and Schwedt, which were put into operation the following year. 2010 saw the formal takeover of Märka GmbH by Verbio with a transaction volume of EUR 24.57 million. In 2011, Verbio launched a pilot project for straw processing for biogas production and further expanded into Eastern Europe.

On November 30, 2023, Verbio Vereinigte BioEnergie AG (Aktiengesellschaft) was transformed into Verbio SE (Societas Europaea).

== Subsidiaries ==
Verbio SE acts as the management holding company within the group. The operating business is conducted by the subsidiaries.

- Verbio Bitterfeld GmbH, Bitterfeld-Wolfen, Germany
- Verbio Schwedt GmbH, Schwedt, Germany
- Verbio Zörbig GmbH, Zörbig, Germany
- Verbio Agrar GmbH, Zörbig, Germany (formerly Märka GmbH)
- Verbio Pinnow GmbH, Pinnow, Germany
- Verbio Logistik GmbH, Zörbig, Germany
- Verbio Polska Sp. z o.o. Szczecin, Poland
- Verbio India Private Limited, Chandigarh, India
- Verbio North America, Corporation, Stamford, Connecticut, United States
- Verbio Nevada, LLC, Nevada, Iowa, United States
- Verbio Diesel Canada Corporation, Welland, Ontario, Canada
- South Bend Ethanol, LLC, South Bend, Indiana, United States
- XiMo Hungary Kft., Budapest, Hungary
