= Prime Standard =

The Prime Standard is a market segment of the Frankfurt Stock Exchange that includes companies which comply with transparency standards higher than those of the General Standard, which is regulated by law. The Prime Standard includes quarterly reporting as well as ad hoc disclosure in German and English, application of international accounting standards (IFRS/IAS or US-GAAP), publication of a financial calendar and staging of at least one analyst conference per year. Companies must satisfy the requirements of the Prime Standard to be listed in the DAX, MDAX, TecDAX and SDAX.
