= Wüstenrot (disambiguation) =

Wüstenrot is a town in Germany.

Wüstenrot may also refer to:

- Wüstenrot & Württembergische, a German financial company
  - Wüstenrot Bank, former subsidiary of Wüstenrot & Württembergische
- Wüstenrot-Gruppe, an Austrian financial company
- SV Wüstenrot Salzburg, the 1997–2005 name of FC Red Bull Salzburg, an Austrian association football club, based in Wals-Siezenheim
- Wüstenrot Tower (German: Wüstenrot-Hochhaus), high-rise building in Ludwigsburg, Germany
