= SDAX =

Stock index of 70 German Small Caps

- Foundation: 21 June 1999
- Operator: STOXX (Qontigo, Deutsche Börse)
- Exchanges: Frankfurt Stock Exchange
- Constituents: 70
- Type: Small-cap, non-technology sectors
- Weighting method: Capitalization-weighted
- Related indices: DAX, MDAX, TecDAX
- Website: SDAX homepage

The SDAX (German abbreviation for Small-Cap-deutsche Aktienindex) is a stock market index composed of 70 small and medium-sized companies in Germany. These so-called 'small caps' rank directly below the MDAX (mid-cap) shares in terms of order book volume and market capitalization. They are thus the 91st–160th largest publicly traded companies in Germany.

The index is based on prices generated in the electronic trading system Xetra.

== Companies ==
The table below shows the 70 companies included in the SDAX as of December 2025.

Logo	Name	Industry	Location
	1&1 AG	Telecommunications	Montabaur
	Adesso SE	IT and consulting	Dortmund
	Adtran Networks SE	Telecommunications equipment	Meiningen
	Alzchem Group		
	Amadeus FiRe AG	Personnel and Training services	Frankfurt am Main
	Atoss Software AG	Software	Munich
	Befesa	Hazardous waste	Luxembourg
	Borussia Dortmund	Sports	Dortmund
	Cancom SE	IT	Munich
	Cewe Stiftung & Co. KGaA	Printing	Oldenburg
	Dermapharm Holding SE	Pharmaceuticals	Grünwald
	Deutsche Beteiligungs AG	Private Equity	Frankfurt am Main
	Deutsche Euroshop	Real Estate	Hamburg
	Deutz AG	Mechanical engineering	Köln
	Douglas	Cosmetics	Düsseldorf
	Drägerwerk AG & Co. KGaA	Engineering, medical technology	Lübeck
	Dürr AG	Automotive	Bietigheim-Bissingen
	Eckert & Ziegler Strahlen- und Medizintechnik AG	Medical equipment	Berlin
	Elmos Semiconductor SE	Electrical engineering	Dortmund
	Energiekontor AG	Renewable Energy	Bremen
	Evotec	Pharmaceuticals	Hamburg
	Formycon		
	GFT Technologies SE	Software	Stuttgart
	Grand City Properties S.A.	Real Estate	Luxembourg City
	Grenke AG	Financial services	Baden-Baden
	Hamborner Reit AG	Real Estate	Duisburg
	Heidelberger Druckmaschinen AG	Machinery	Heidelberg
	Hornbach Holding AG	Holding, Retail	Neustadt an der Weinstraße
	Hypoport SE	Technology	Lübeck
	Indus Holding AG	Investment management	Bergisch Gladbach
	Jenoptik	Optoelectronics engineering	Jena
	Jost Werke AG	Automotive	Neu-Isenburg
	Klöckner & Co SE	Steel and metal distribution	Duisburg
	Kontron AG	Computer hardware	Augsburg
	KSB SE & Co. KGaA	Mechanical engineering	Frankenthal (Pfalz)
	KWS Saat SE & Co. KGaA	Agriculture, Biotechnology	Einbeck
	LPKF Laser Electronics		
	MBB	Holding	Berlin
	Medios		
	MLP	Financial services	Wiesloch
	Mutares SE & Co. KGaA	Holding	Munich
	Nagarro SE	Software	Munich
	Norma Group SE	Machinery	Maintal
	Patrizia SE	Real Estate	Augsburg
	PBB AG	Banking	Garching
	PNE AG	Wind energy	Cuxhaven
	ProCredit	Banking	Frankfurt
	ProSiebenSat.1 Media SE	Media	Unterföhring
	PVA TePla AG	Machinery	Wettenberg
	SAF-Holland SE	Industry	Luxembourg City
	Salzgitter AG	Iron and steel	Salzgitter
	Schaeffler AG	Automotive	Herzogenaurach
	Schott Pharma AG & Co. KGaA	Pharmaceuticals	Mainz
	Secunet Security Networks	Information security	Essen
	SFC Energy AG	Energy	Brunnthal
	Siltronic	Technology	Munich
	Sixt	Car rental	Munich
	SMA Solar	Solar energy	Niestetal
	Springer Nature	Academic publishing	Berlin
	Stabilus	Technology	Koblenz
	Sto SE & Co. KGaA	Chemicals	Stühlingen
	Stratec SE	Medical equipment	Birkenfeld
	Südzucker AG	Food processing	Mannheim
	Thyssenkrupp Nucera AG & Co. KGaA	Engineering	Dortmund
	Verve Group SE	Technology	Berlin
	Vossloh AG	Rail infrastructure	Werdohl
	Wacker Neuson SE	Construction equipment	Munich
	Wüstenrot & Württembergische AG	Financial services	Kornwestheim

== See also ==
- DAX
- MDAX
- TecDAX
- ÖkoDAX
