= Multi-seat valve =

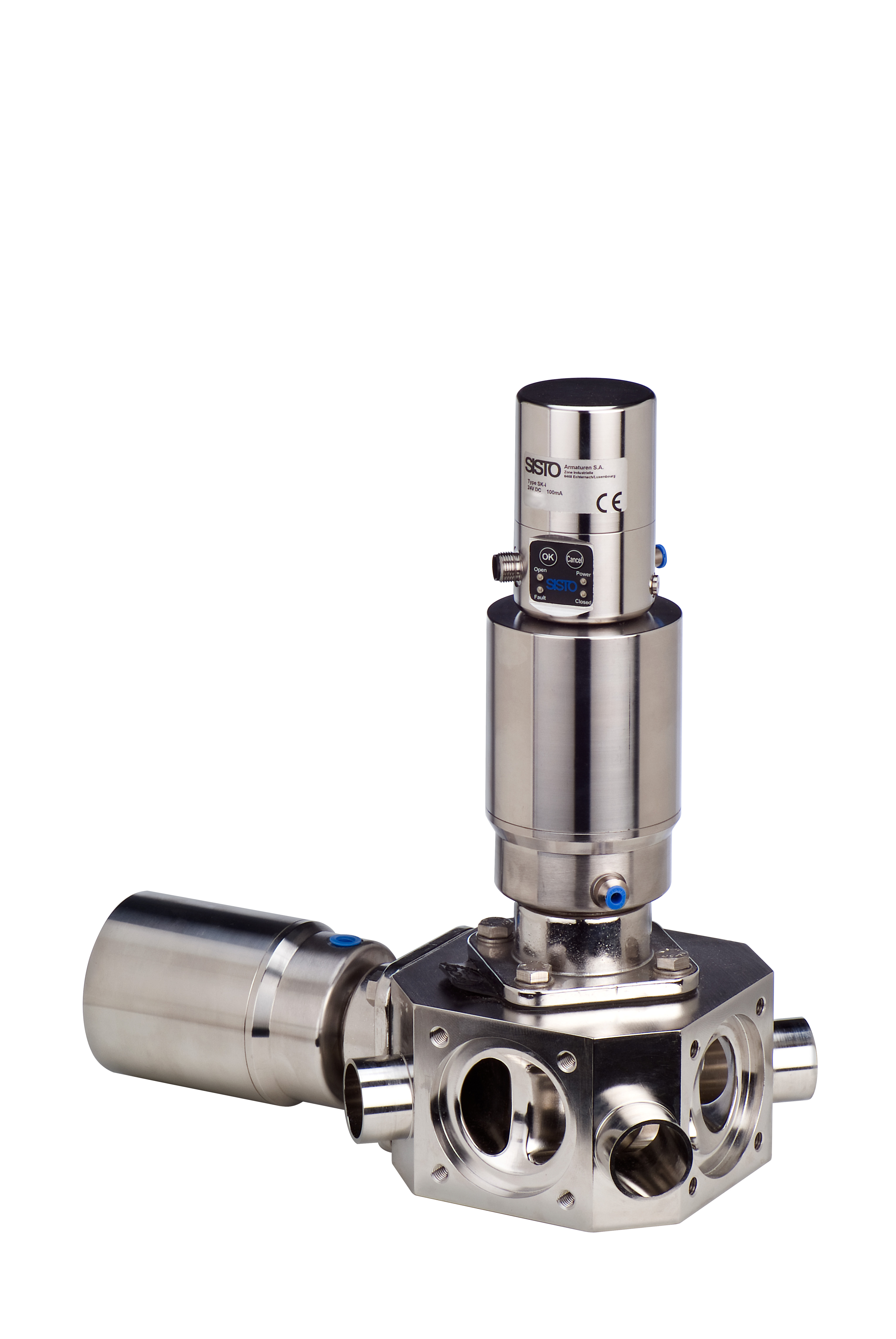
Multi-seat valve with pneumatic actuator

Multi-seat valves, or multi-port valves, are used to shut off or control complex liquid flows in sterile areas in the beverage and food industry as well as in the fine chemical and pharmaceutical industry. Multi-seat valves often replace combinations of several single-seated valves in aseptic processing.

== Use and function ==
Especially in the production of pharmaceutical active substances, but also for numerous aseptic processes, installations with a high degree of individualization are required as the high variant diversity can hardly be covered by standard components. As a result, valve manufacturers demand high expertise in the field of construction as well as close interaction between planner and manufacturer at the planning stage of (aseptic) installations to ensure e.g. the draining capability of the installation along with utmost compactness. That arises from the product-related high diversity of biotechnological processes and from particularities in the processing and consolidation of ingredients for these highly sensitive products.

Similar to single-seated valves, multi-seat valves consist of the valve body, however, are equipped with various diaphragms and actuators, as well as one control and feedback unit per actuator.

With the exclusive use of gate valves, i.e. diaphragm valves that block the flow in a pipeline using a single diaphragm, the variation options would be limited to different nominal connection sizes. Adding and combining T- or Y-shaped single-seated valves allows quite complicated process flows and distributions. Nonetheless, multi-seat valves contain specific advantages for aseptic processes, leading to a virtually endless flexibility in system design.

Since multi-seat valves are mostly made from a forged block, which enables an extremely compact design, they are sometimes referred to as block valves.

The compactness of a multifunctional multi-seat valve and hence the installation can be strongly influenced by the size of available actuators. Significant advantages can be achieved by using actuators whose diameters is not larger than the diaphragms' diameters.

Distinguished manufacturers of multi-seat valves are GEMÜ, Bürkert, Saunders and SISTO.

Comparison between single-seated valve constructions and multi-seat valves

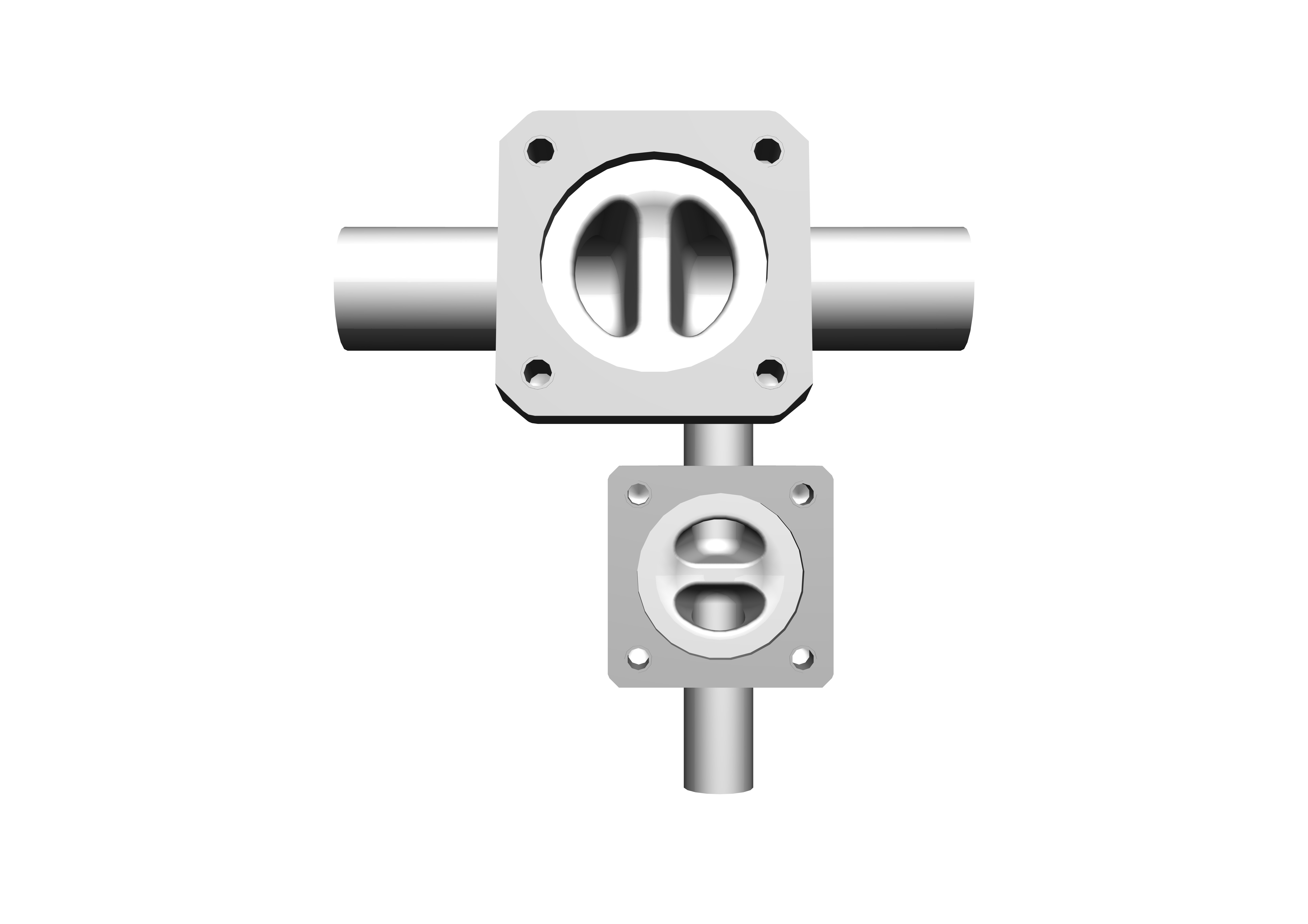
Valve combination (scheme)

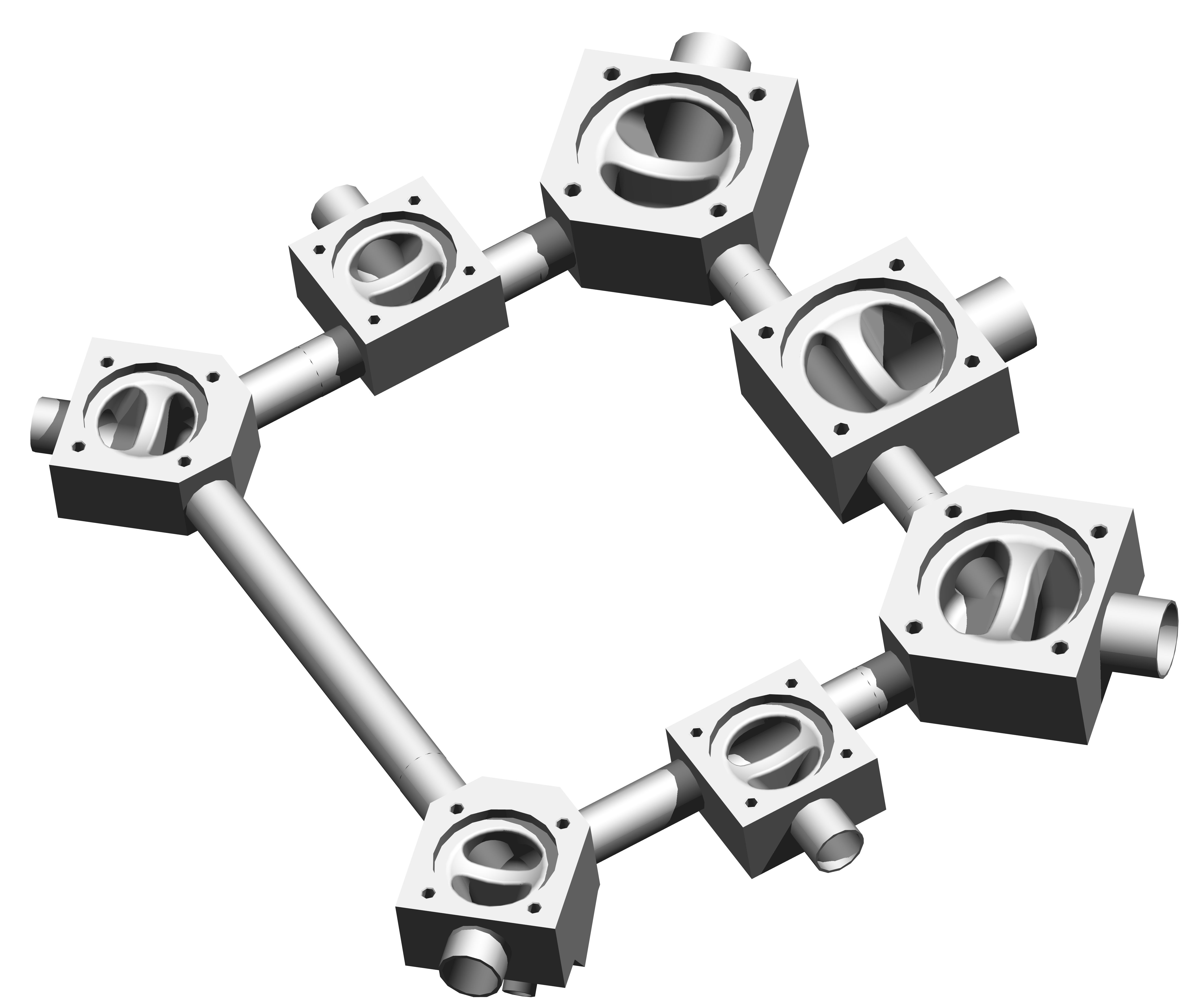
Circular construction (scheme)

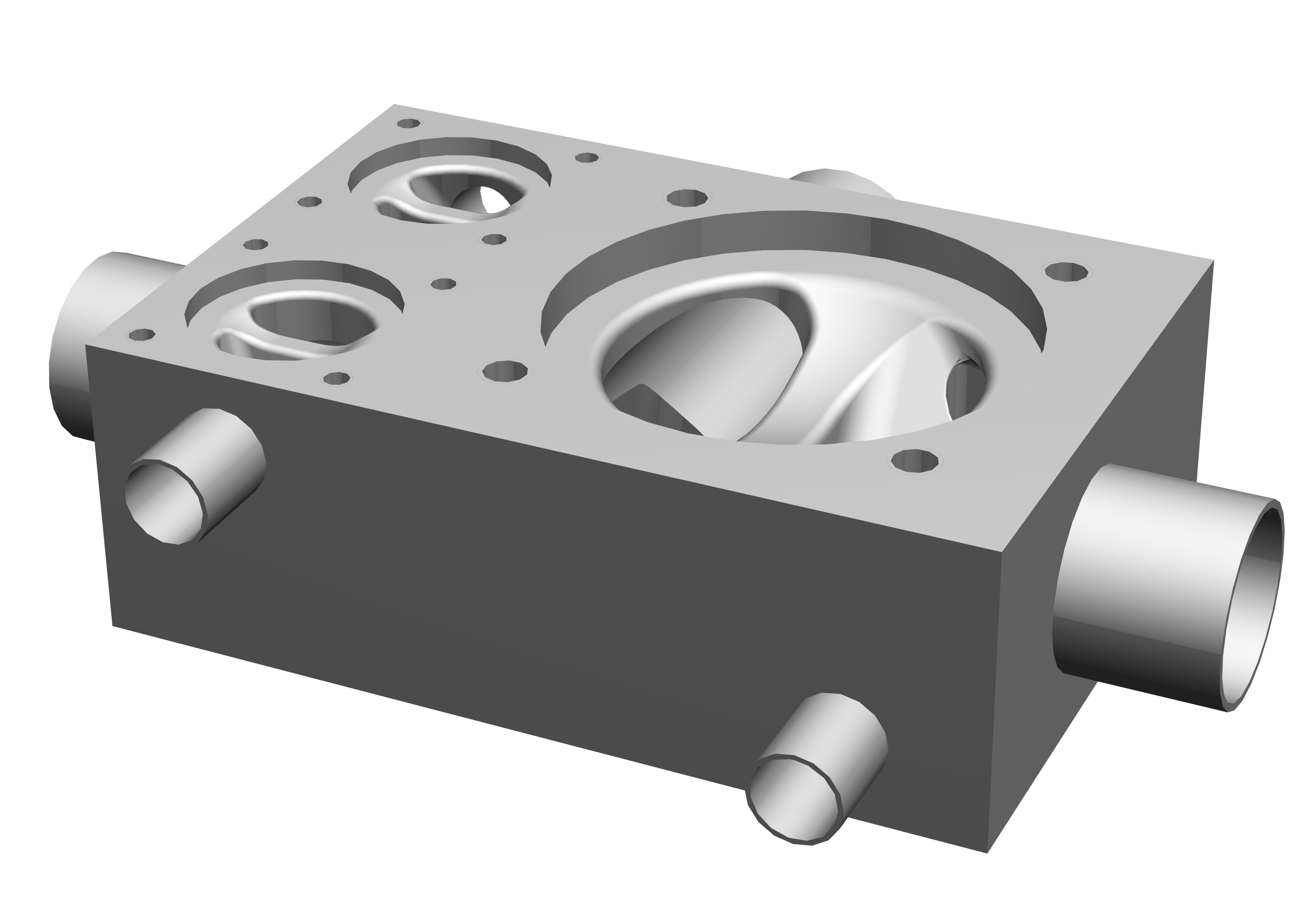
Multi-seat valve (scheme)

== Cleanability ==
Due to the compact layout of the multi-seat valve, its dimensions are smaller, hence the (sub-) system requires less space. Furthermore, the surface in contact with medium inside the valve can be significantly reduced compared to the circular construction, which is advantageous in terms of cleaning and draining capability. Furthermore, multi-seat valves contain fewer areas of bad rinsing or accumulation of the product.

In terms of rinsing out valve combinations, the "3D-rule" must be taken in account. According to this rule, the length of a branch up to the valve seat should not exceed three times the diameter of the branch. Using a multi-seated construction, "dead branches" can be avoided, so microbial contaminants in the stagnant medium are reduced considerably.

If the valve is installed correctly at the defined inclined position and the inner metal surface is of high quality, modern inner geometry allows a complete self-draining of the diaphragm valve.

== Actuator types ==
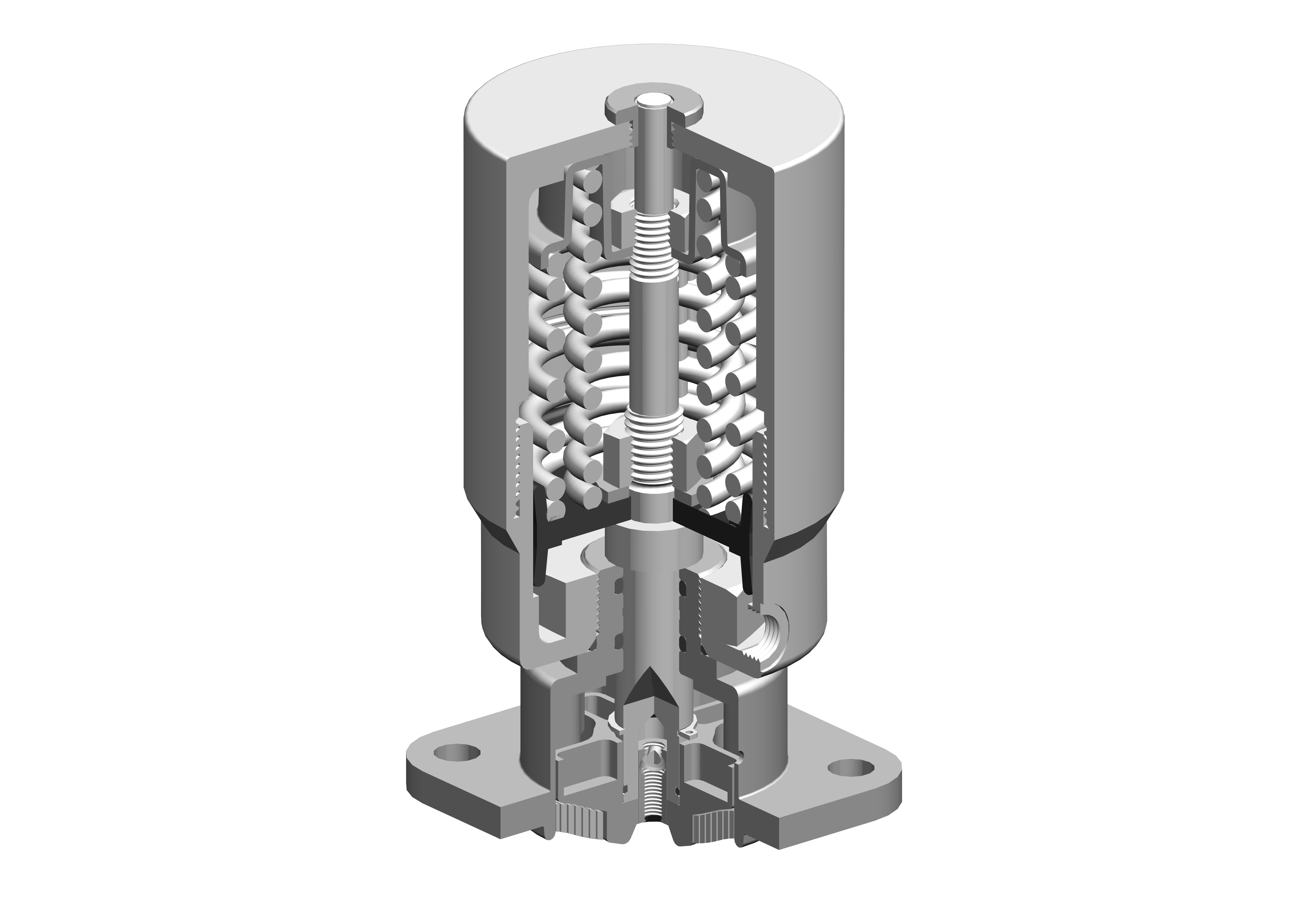
Pneumatic piston actuator (scheme)

On account of the mostly complex constructions of multi-seat valves, pneumatic actuators are used in most cases. Pneumatic actuators can be differentiated as piston and diaphragm actuators depending on the design.

Advantages on the piston actuator are in a compact design that is especially suitable for multi-seat constructions. Lightweight multi-seat valves with less "dead spaces" can thus be designed. Since the piston actuator has a smooth surface without areas difficult to clean, the outside is easier to clean compared to the diaphragm actuator.

Advantage on the diaphragm actuator, however, is a more cost-effective assembly.

== See also ==
Valve

Diaphragm valve
