= SFC Energy =

SFC Energy AG
- Company type: Public
- Traded as: SDAX
- ISIN: DE0007568578
- Industry: Energy industry
- Founded: 2000; 25 years ago (as Gigantus Vermögensverwaltung)
- Headquarters: Brunnthal, Germany
- Products: fuel cells
- Revenue: 118.15 million Euro (2022)
- Number of employees: 326 (2022)
- Website: www.sfc.com

SFC Energy is a manufacturer of direct methanol and hydrogen fuel cells based in Brunnthal near Munich. The company also develops solutions for off-grid and stationary power generation and distribution. This also includes the production of voltage converters and switching power supplies. The fuel cells are produced at the headquarters in Brunnthal. Other production sites are located in Almelo in the Netherlands (PBF Group, development & production of power electronics), in Romania (PBF Power) and in Canada (Simark Controls division).

== History ==
Gigantus Vermögensverwaltung was founded in 2000 and transformed into Smart Fuel Cell GmbH (SFC) in 2002. In 2006, the company was transformed into a stock corporation. The change from the open market to the Prime Standard of the Frankfurt Stock Exchange in May 2007 was combined with a capital increase and generated around 57 million euros.

The company was renamed SFC Energy in 2010. In November 2010, Holland Private Equity (HPE) acquired around 25 percent of the shares from company founder Manfred Stefener and PRICAP Venture Partners and thus became a major shareholder in the company. The company has been listed on the OTC market since April 2006. The largest shareholder is HPE PRO Institutional Fund with around 25%, with around 48% of the shares in free float. The shares have been listed on the SDAX since December 2022.

In a period of over a decade following SFC's IPO in 2006, the company's balance sheet showed losses. The 57 million euros in issue proceeds were thus completely used up. A significant profit was achieved in 2018. Turnover increased from 32.4 million euros in 2013 to 279 million euros at the end of 2018.

In the fourth quarter of 2011, the company acquired the Dutch PBF Group, which had emerged from Philips in 1999.

In January 2020, it was announced that SFC Energy will supply emergency power supply systems for mobile phone stations in Germany in cooperation with the Canadian company Ballard Power Systems and the German company AdKor.

== Products ==
SFC products are used to supply off-grid power to industrial, public and private users. According to the company, it had sold over 41,000 fuel cells by January 2019 (January 2016: 34,000; January 2017: 35,000) for the leisure, industrial and defense & security sectors. SFC Energy's fuel cell systems are direct methanol fuel cells (DMFC). The DMFC product lines include small, portable units (e.g. in the defense & security sector) as well as more powerful, transportable units, e.g. as portable units or trailer systems. Another field of activity is electronic components such as voltage converters and switching power supplies for industry, which SFC develops, produces and sells internationally. The products are increasingly supplied as system solutions for power supply. In addition to the DMFC product line, fuel cells that run on hydrogen instead of methanol have been offered since 2019.
