= Stratec =

STRATEC SE
- Traded as: ETR:SBS; SDAX
- ISIN: DE000STRA555
- Founded: 1979
- Headquarters: Birkenfeld, Germany
- Key people: Marcus Wolfinger (CEO), Dr. Robert Siegle, Dr. Claus Vielsack, Dr. Georg Bauer
- Revenue: ~ € 221 million (2019)
- Number of employees: ~ 1300
- Website: stratec.com

STRATEC SE (formerly STRATEC Biomedical AG) is a company with worldwide operations that designs and manufactures fully automated analyzer systems for partners in clinical diagnostics and biotechnology - particularly in the field of in-vitro-diagnostics.

As a classic original equipment manufacturer (OEM) supplier, STRATEC produces its systems almost exclusively on behalf of its customers. Alongside the systems themselves, the company also provides sample preparation solutions, system software and integrated laboratory software (Middleware). STRATEC is also responsible for development documentation, testing, delivery of systems, and the supply of spare parts and complex consumables for diagnostic and medical applications. STRATEC's customers are well known diagnostic companies like DiaSorin, Abbott, SIEMENS, Bio-Rad or Hologic.

== Locations ==
Since its foundation, the company's headquarters has been in Birkenfeld (Enz), Gräfenhausen neighborhood. The company also has several branches and development and production sites:

Land	Standort
Germany	Birkenfeld
Switzerland	Beringen
USA	Medley, FL
Romania	Cluj-Napoca
Hungary	Budapest
Austria	Anif
China	Taicang

== History ==
The company was founded in Birkenfeld in 1979. Stratec Biomedical AG was publicly listed (IPO) in 1998. The wholly owned subsidiary Robion AG was founded in Switzerland in 2005 and later renamed Stratec Biomedical Switzerland AG. Sanguin International, Ltd. (UK) was acquired in 2006 and renamed Stratec Biomedical UK, Ltd. This was followed in 2009 by the acquisition of Invitek Gesellschaft für Biotechnik & Biodesign mbH (Berlin), which was renamed STRATEC Molecular GmbH.

In November 2010, the company was admitted into the TecDAX stock market index. In March 2016, STRATEC acquired the Hungary-based company Diatron, a hematology system specialist. The company develops and manufactures analyzer systems and complementary products for use in human and veterinary diagnostics. In June 2016, another acquisition was announced: Sony DADC Biosciences GmbH, headquartered in Anif, Austria.

In November 2018, the company completed its conversion into a European Company (Societas Europaea, SE), known as STRATEC SE.

In 2019, STRATEC SE sold its nucleic-acid purification business, including all shares held in STRATEC Molecular GmbH; the transaction closed on 31 March 2019. Following its acquisition by the NUVISAN Group, STRATEC Molecular GmbH was renamed Invitek Molecular GmbH (effective 1 April 2019).

== Subsidiaries ==
- STRATEC Consumables GmbH

== Mergers & Acquisitions ==
=== 2023 ===
==== Natech Plastics ====
In June 2023, Stratec announced an agreement to acquire Natech Plastics, a US-based contract holder serving the medical technology sector with the development and marketing of polymer-based consumables for medical applications. Natech operates three production facilities with production press sizes ranging from 40 to 400 tons, including hydraulic, electric, and hybrid presses. The deal was valued at $30 million, with an additional earn-out dependent on performance criteria through 2025. The acquisition was set to complete in July 2023.

== Gallery ==
Company headquarters in Gräfenhausen

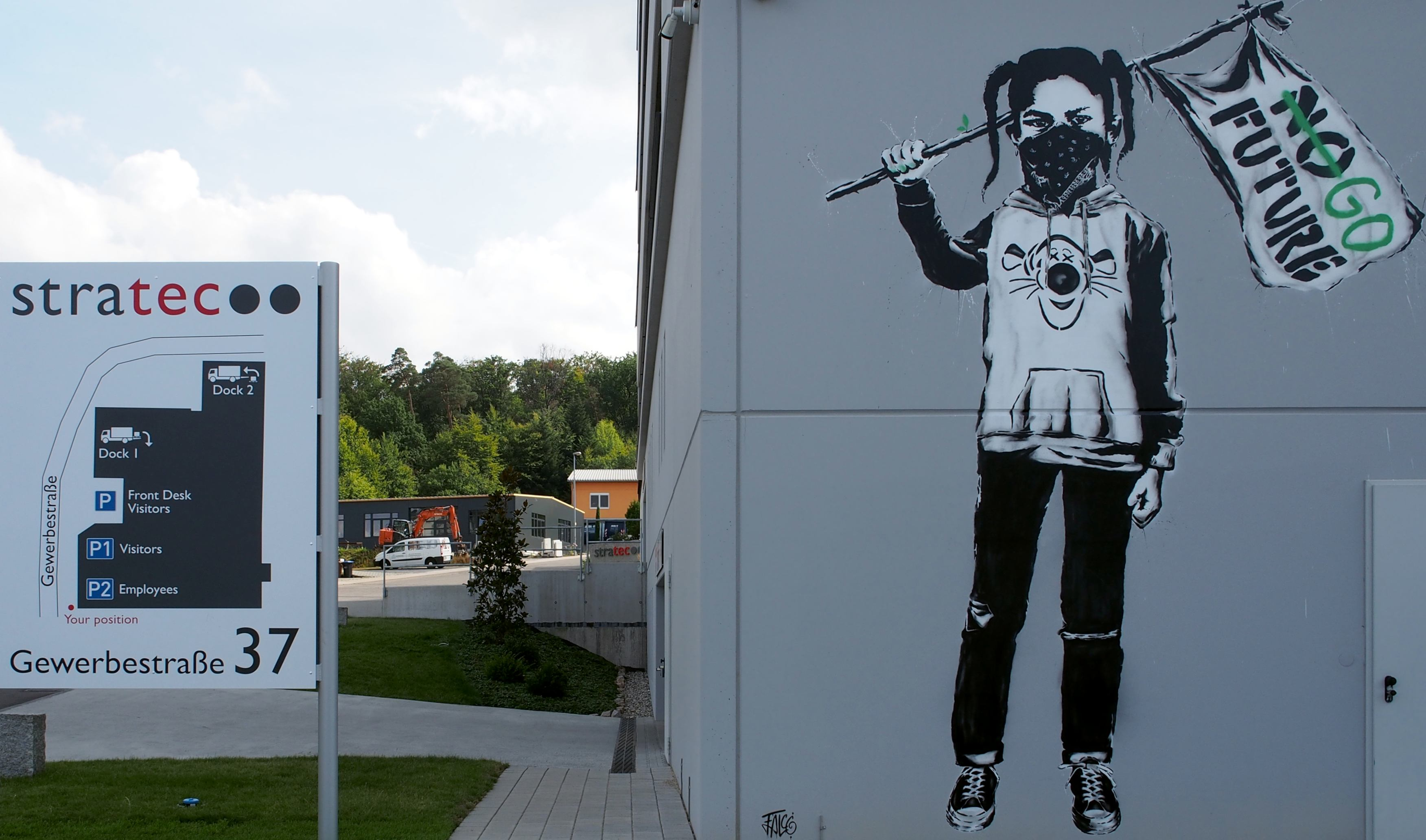
Artwork on the 2022 expansion building
