= Jost Werke =

German vehicle manufacturer

JOST Werke SE
- Type: Societas Europaea
- Traded as: SDAX
- ISIN: DE000JST4000
- Industry: Automotive
- Founded: 1952; 74 years ago
- Headquarters: Neu-Isenburg, Germany
- Revenue: €1.2 billion (2023)
- Number of employees: 4,500 (2023)
- Website: www.jost-world.com

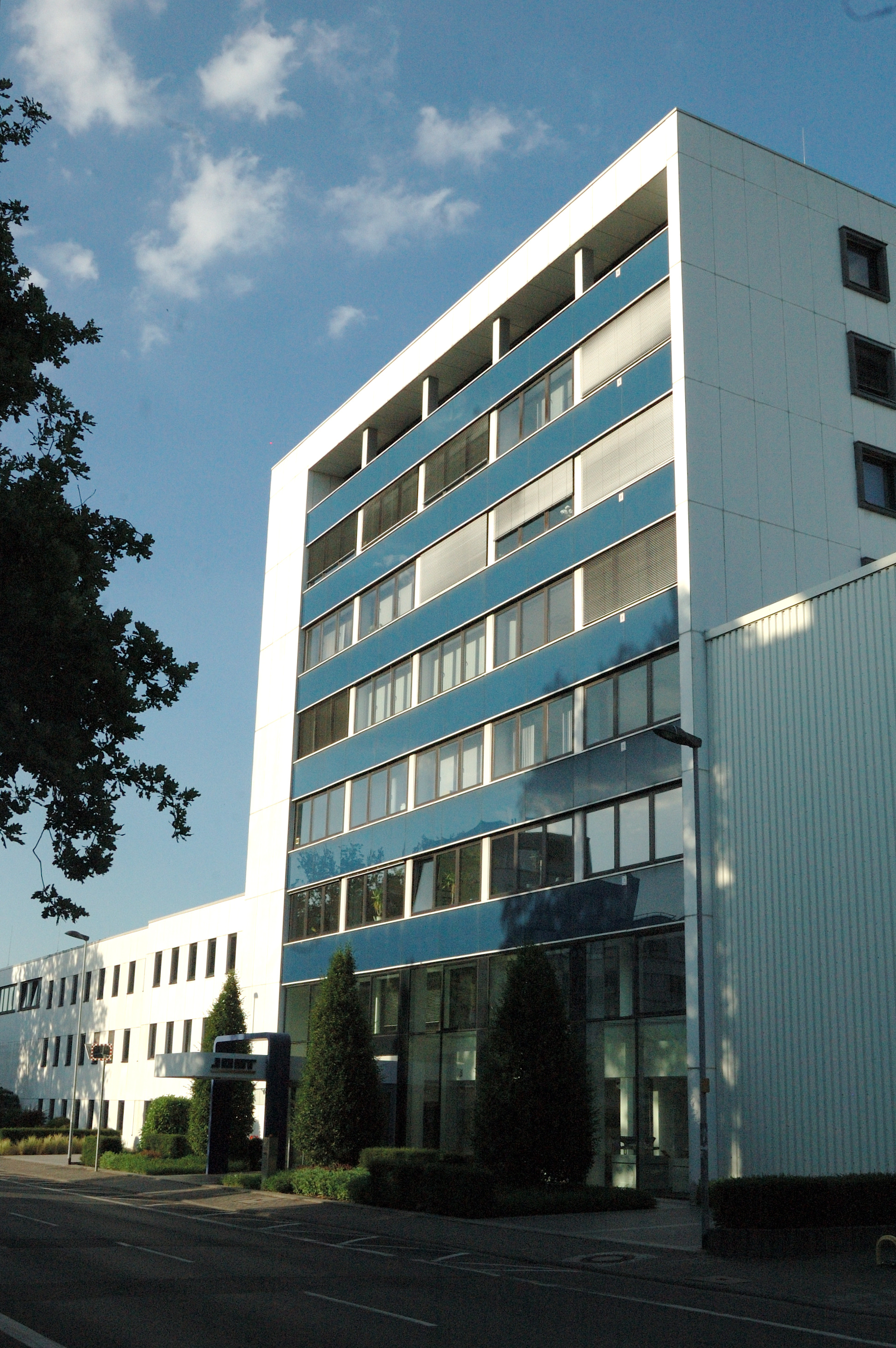
Company headquarters in Neu-Isenburg

Jost Werke SE (proper spelling: JOST Werke SE) is a manufacturer of systems for commercial vehicles based in Neu-Isenburg, Germany. Jost Werke is a leading international manufacturer and supplier for the trucking industry. The company focuses on the manufacture of safety-related systems for tractors, semi-trailers and trailers. The company has been listed on the Frankfurt Stock Exchange since July 20, 2017.

== History ==
The company was founded in 1952 as a factory for ball wreaths by Hans Breuer and Joseph Steingass. Four years later, the production of fifth wheels began. As early as 1960, Jost expanded to the UK and to apartheid-era South Africa (plant in Chloorkop). Further expansion followed in the 1970s and 80s – including in Italy, France, the United States, Spain and Australia. To increase capacity, a second plant was built in Wolframs-Eschenbach in Germany in 1980. In 2000, Jost opened its first plant in the United States in Greeneville, Tennessee. One year later, the manufacturer of towbars Rockinger was acquired. Further acquisitions followed in 2008 with the manufacturer of trailer axle steering systems Tridec and in 2015 Mercedes-Benz TrailerAxleSystems. In 2008, Jost, which is considered a hidden champion, was itself acquired by the private equity firm Cinven. The company went public on July 20, 2017, with an IPO. By January 2018, the previous owner Cinven had sold all shares of Jost. The company has been listed on the SDAX since March 19, 2018. The takeover of the Swedish company Ålö Holding AB, which specializes in agricultural front loaders, took place in 2020.

== Locations ==
Jost has sales offices and production facilities in over 20 countries on five continents. The head office is located in Neu-Isenburg. Other production sites in Germany are Wolframs-Eschenbach and Waltershausen (production and sales).
