= Cancom SE =

German IT services company

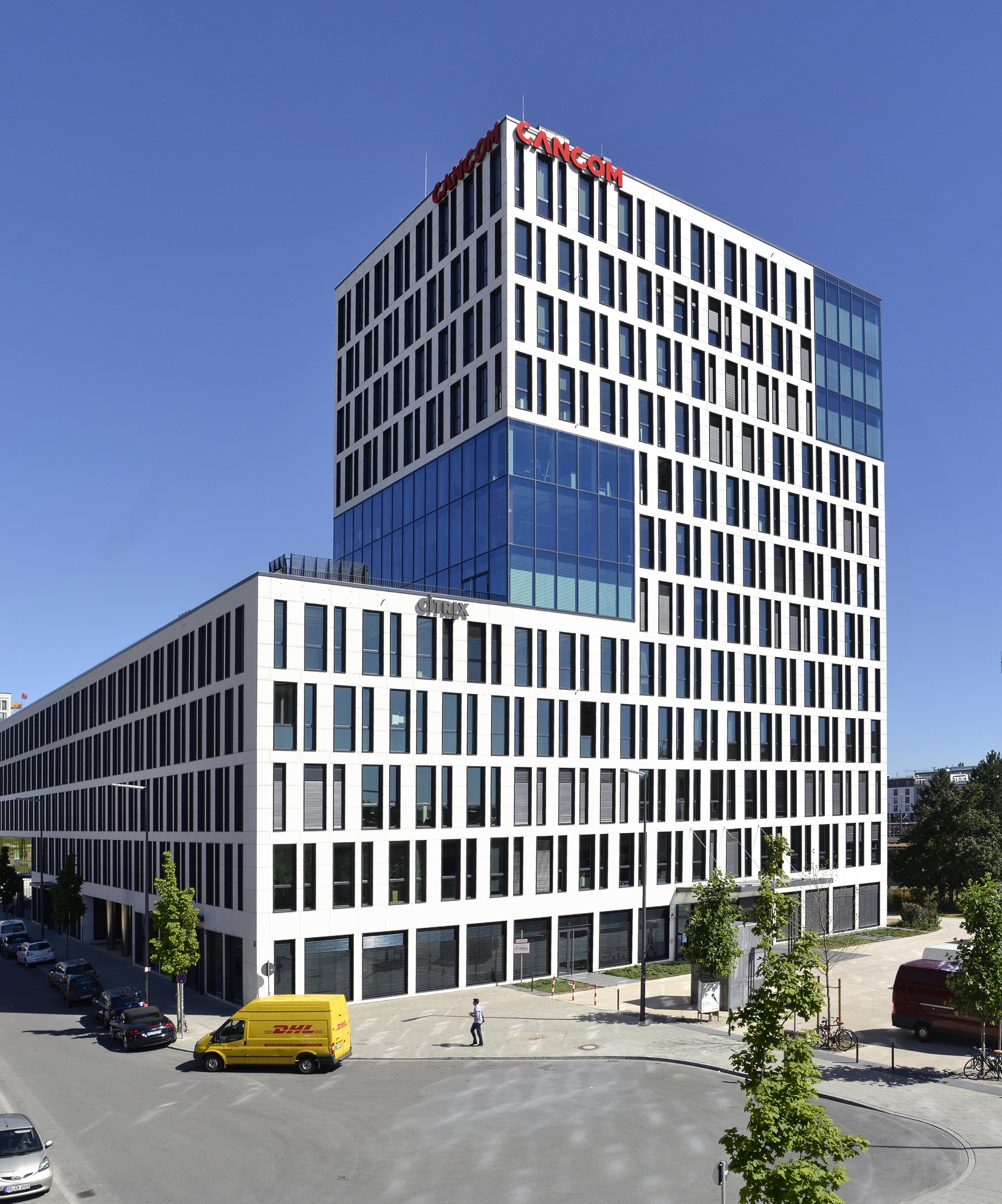
- Cancom Headquarters in Munich
- Type: Societas Europaea
- Traded as: SDAX
- Industry: IT services
- Founded: 1992; 34 years ago
- Headquarters: Munich, Germany
- Revenue: €1.5 billion (2023)
- Number of employees: 5,600 (2022)
- Website: cancom.de

Cancom SE is a German company for IT services based in Munich in the field of cloud computing. Cancom was the sixth-largest IT systems house in Germany in 2023.

== History ==
The Cancom Group was founded in 1992 by Klaus Weinmann, Stefan Kober und Raymond Kober. The first branch office was opened in the 1994/1995 financial year. Shortly afterwards, the company entered the catalog business in January 1996. In 1997, Cancom switched to centralized logistics. In May 1998, the Cancom WebShop was introduced. On September 16, 1999, the company went public on the Frankfurt Stock Exchange. Cancom has been listed in the Prime Standard since January 2003.

On August 29, 2019, the Cancom stock was unscheduled promoted from the SDAX index to the MDAX on the Frankfurt Stock Exchange, where it replaced the Axel Springer SE share. Cancom SE was again included in the SDAX index on September 19, 2022.

== Operations ==
Cancom has around 80 locations in the DACH region, Belgium, Slovakia, Romania and the Czech Republic and employs around 5,600 people. According to its own information, around half of the Group's revenue is generated in the IT Solutions division, the rest in the E-Commerce/trade division. Cancom covers IT requirements of commercial customers. In addition to products, Cancom also offers IT services.
