= Wüstenrot Tower =

Coordinates: 48°52′58″N 9°11′21″E

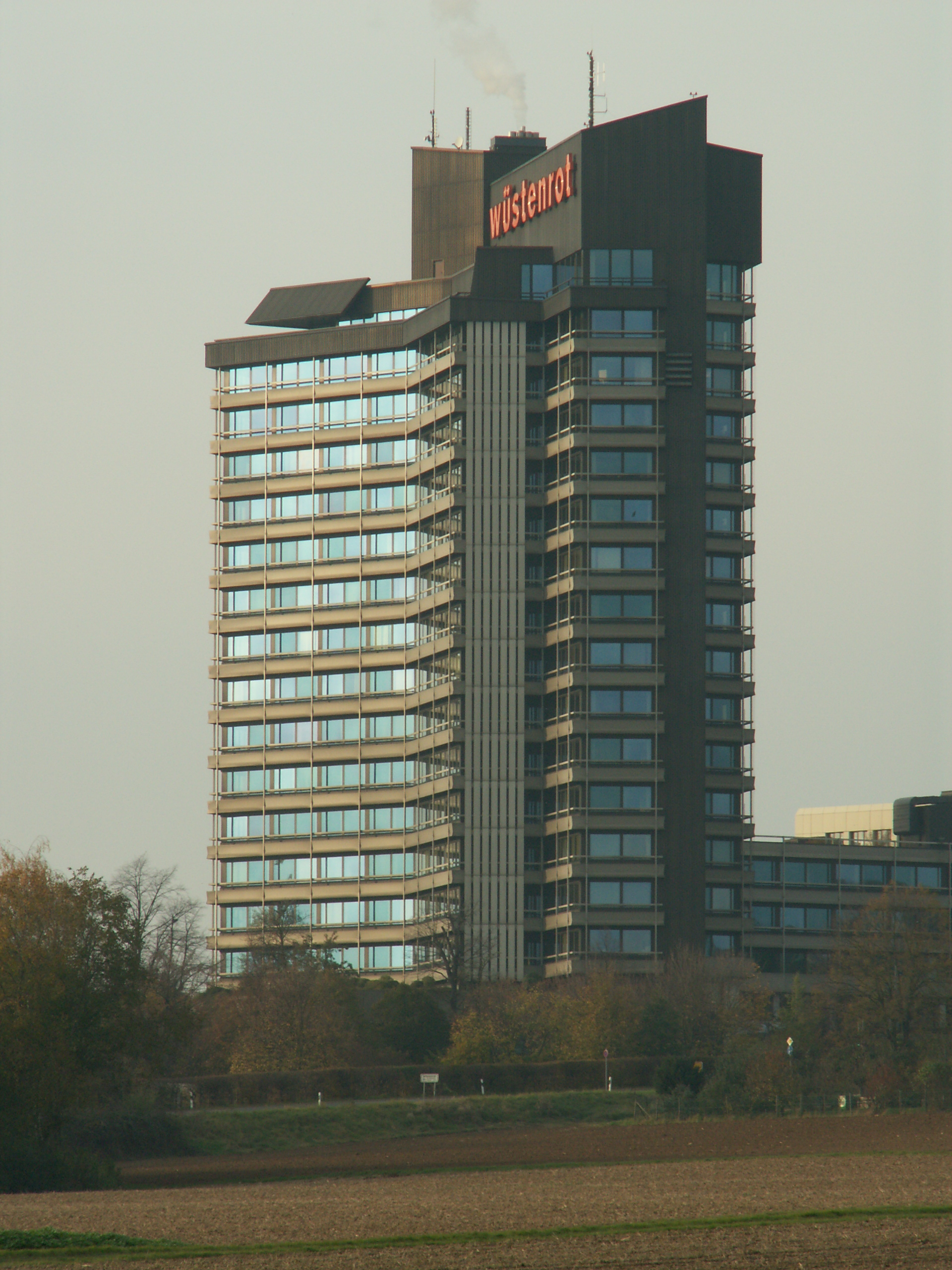
Wüstenrot Highrise Building

The Wüstenrot Tower (German: Wüstenrot-Hochhaus ) is a high-rise building in Ludwigsburg that was the central office building of GdF Wüstenrot, a building and loan association. It was designed by architect Prof. Ludwig Kresse in Stuttgart. The address of the 72 metres (236 ft.; including antenna on top 79 metres or 246 ft.) tall building is Im Tambour 1, 71630 Ludwigsburg.

Wüstenrot Tower is the tallest habitable building of Ludwigsburg and also one of the tallest high-rise buildings in Stuttgart area. It has 6 elevators with a capacity of 11 persons each and a freight elevator, which carries up to 1950 kilograms. Wüstenrot Tower is a modern landmark of Ludwigsburg and by its site at the southern edge of Ludwigsburg far visible.

Wüstenrot moved out of the building in 2023 to new offices in Kornwestheim. The surrounding area is planned to be redeveloped into a mixed-use development, with the former office tower to be renovated and used for housing.
