= Norma Group =

Manufacturing company

- Traded as: SDAX

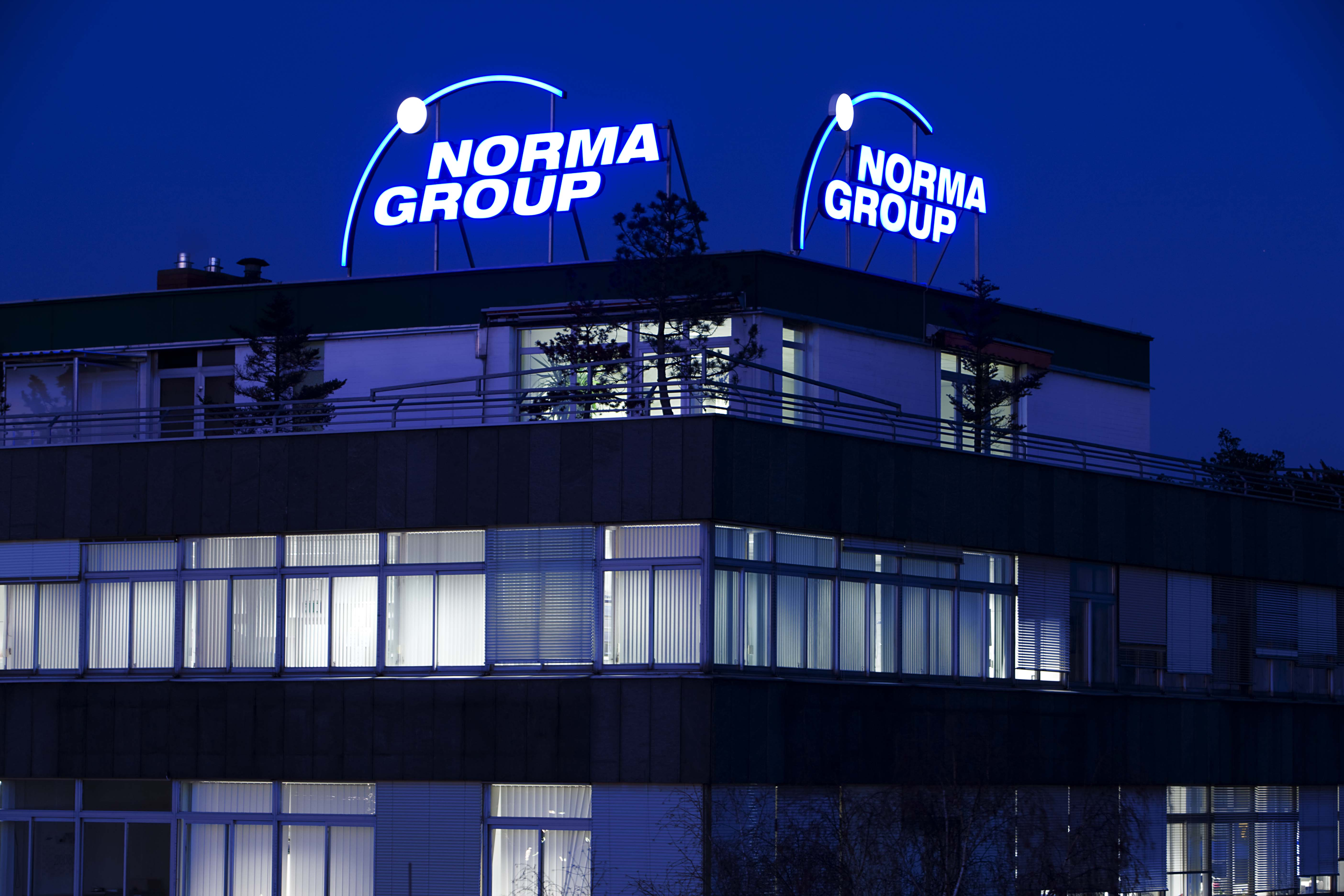
Picture of the company's headquarters in Maintal

Norma Group SE (often written as NORMA) is a German manufacturer of machine joining components, such as hose couplings, clamps and quick connectors. The company's products are used in industries such as automotive, aviation, construction and shipping, and for purposes such as cooling, emission outputs, hoses, water pipes and sterile pharmaceuticals production.

The company is based in Maintal in Hesse, near Frankfurt, and is listed on the Frankfurt Stock Exchange (FWB: NOEJ). As of November 2015, it is a member of the SDAX index of small-cap companies. As of 2019, the company has about 8,900 employees. It markets its products under a range of brand names, such as ABA, Breeze, Connectors, Serflex, Serratub, Terry and Torca as well as Norma.

The company was founded as Rasmussen GmbH in 1949 by Ove Skafte Rasmussen, a son of Danish industrialist Jørgen Skafte Rasmussen. It was family-owned until a 2006 management buyout and merger with ABA, a Swedish company, funded by the private equity company 3i. It also took over Breeze Industrial Products, an American company, in 2007. The company was publicly listed in 2011 under its present name, which it already used as a brand name.

It purchased the Michigan-based company Craig Assembly in 2013, a specialist in injection-moulded components, and California-based company National Diversified Systems, which makes plastic water piping products, in 2014. It also bought Malaysian company Chien Jin Plastic in 2014.

The company has two production plants in China and one in Brazil, among other locations.
