= Dermapharm =

German pharmaceutical company

Dermapharm Holding SE
- Company type: Societas Europaea
- Traded as: SDAX
- ISIN: DE000A2GS5D8
- Industry: Pharmaceutical industry
- Founded: 1991; 35 years ago
- Headquarters: Grünwald, Bavaria, Germany
- Revenue: 1.164.978 TEUR (2025)
- Operating income: 182,890,000 euro (2023)
- Net income: 62,370,000 euro (2023)
- Total assets: 2,160,670,000 euro (2023)
- Number of employees: 3.503 (2025)
- Website: https://dermapharm.com/en-en/

Dermapharm Holding SE or Dermapharm AG, based in Grünwald, is a publicly listed German pharmaceutical company specializing in the manufacture and distribution of dermatological and allergological preparations.

== Company ==
The company was founded in 1991 by Wilhelm Beier. The company has been based in Grünwald near Munich since 1998. Dermapharm also has sites in Austria, Switzerland, Croatia, Poland and Ukraine as well as in the UK, Italy and Spain. The company manufactures almost all of its products in Germany. With its subsidiary mibe GmbH Arzneimittel, Dermapharm has its own production site in Brehna near Leipzig. The product portfolio mainly consists of generic drugs. After October 2020, the company produced the COVID-19 vaccine tozinameran at the Brenna site on behalf of Biontech. Since the end of April 2021, production of the vaccine started at the subsidiary Allergopharma at the Reinbek site.

A sale of the company to investors failed in 2016. In 2018, the Beier family then sold 19.3% of their shares as part of the IPO, leaving them with around 65% of the outstanding shares.

Other companies in the Dermapharm Group are acis Arzneimittel (generics), Anton Hübner (health food products), Tiroler Nussöl Sonnenkosmetik (sun protection products), Axicorp (generics, reimports), Trommsdorff and Strathmann. In February 2020, Merck KGaA announced the sale of Allergopharma, which specializes in allergy treatments, to Dermapharm.

At the beginning of 2022, Dermapharm acquired the C³ Group for medical cannabis, formerly part of Bionorica, from the Canadian Canopy Growth Corporation.
