= Persistent Systems =

Indian technology company

- Type: Public
- Traded as: BSE: 533179; NSE: PERSISTENT
- Industry: Information technology
- Founded: 1990; 36 years ago
- Founder: Anand Deshpande
- Headquarters: Pune, Maharashtra, India
- Key people: Anand Deshpande (Chairman and MD); Sandeep Kalra (CEO); Vinit Teredesai (CFO)
- Revenue: ▲₹14,748 crore (US$1.5 billion) (2026)
- Operating income: ▲₹2,303 crore (US$240 million) (2026)
- Net income: ▲₹1,865 crore (US$190 million) (2026)
- Number of employees: 23,941 (December 2024)
- Website: persistent.com
- Footnotes; Financials as of 31 March 2026.

Persistent Systems Ltd is an Indian multinational technology company based in Pune. Founded in 1990, it provides information technology and software engineering services.

== History ==
Persistent's Pingala-Aryabhata campus in Pune

Persistent Systems was founded in 1990 by Anand Deshpande, a former Hewlett-Packard employee, with an investment of $21,000. In 2000, Intel Capital invested $1 million in the company for a 3.5% stake. In 2005, Persistent raised $18.8 million from Norwest Venture Partners, and Gabriel Venture Partners.

Persistent Systems was listed on the National Stock Exchange of India and Bombay Stock Exchange in March 2010 after its initial public offering.

In 2014, Persistent Systems incorporated Accelerite, a wholly owned subsidiary based in Silicon Valley, as its software products arm. In 2016, Persistent Systems launched a specialized engineering service for IBM Watson IoT platform. In 2019, Persistent joined Siemens' MindSphere partner program to deliver industrial internet of things (IIoT) services.

=== Notable acquisitions ===
Year	Company	Price	Ref.
2017	Parx Werk	CHF16 million	
2021	Software Corporation International	US$53 million	
2022	Data Glove	US$90.5 million	
2022	MediaAgility	US$71.71 million	
2024	Starfish Associates	US$20.7 million	
2026	Nagarro (pending)	€1.1 billion	
