= Elmos Semiconductor =

German manufacturer of semiconductor products

Elmos Semiconductor SE
- Company type: Public company
- Traded as: SDAX
- Industry: Electrical engineering
- Founded: 1984
- Headquarters: Dortmund, Germany
- Area served: automotive
- Products: Semiconductors, microstructures
- Subsidiaries: Silicon Microstructures
- Website: http://www.elmos.de/
- Footnotes / references Garnter ranked #2 Automotive ASIC Supplier

Elmos Semiconductor SE is a German manufacturer of semiconductor products headquartered in Dortmund, Germany. Elmos supplies automotive application-specific integrated circuits (ASICs).

== History ==
- 1984 - Founded in Dortmund, Germany
- 1985 - 32 employees, 0.4 M DM turnover, Installation of 4" Wafer Fab in Dortmund
- 1994 - DIN ISO 9001 certificate
- 1998 - 460 employees, 140 M DM turnover. Complete supply from new 6" line
- 1999 - IPO to new market, Frankfurt
- 2001 - 630 employees, 107 million Euro turnover Acquisition of Eurasem (Packaging, NL) and SMI (MEMS, USA)
- 2002 - TS16949
- 2005 - Opened 8" wafer fab in Duisburg as second production line
- 2020 - Conversion of legal form into a Societas Europaea
- 2022 - media reports about possible Chinese takeover which the German government eventually vetoed

== Silicon Microstructures acquisition and sale to TE Connectivity ==
Silicon Microstructures, Inc.(SMI) was founded in 1991 as a commercial source of high-performance silicon pressure sensors, including Microelectromechanical systems sensors, and accelerometers. Its first product was a silicon sensor for very low-pressure usage.

Elmos Semiconductor acquired SMI in March 2001 from OSI Systems. SMI began production on higher performance, system level sensors and microstructures, wireless, RF and bus addressable microstructures.

In August 2002, SMI acquired the IC Sensors' wafer fabrication operations and wafer R&D group and relocated to Milpitas, California. The following year, Silicon Microstructures undertook a significant and complete wafer fabrication upgrade to expand the facility for full 6" wafer handling. This facility processed primarily 6 inch wafers and has advanced technical capabilities including deep reactive ion etching (DRIE) and plasma enhanced fusion bonding.

In 2019, Elmos announced the sale of Silicon Microstructures to TE Connectivity, and the subsequent closure of Elmos Group’s micromechanics division.
