= Nagarro =

German IT service provider

Nagarro SE
- Type: Societas Europaea
- Traded as: SDAX
- ISIN: DE000A3H2200
- Industry: IT services
- Founded: 1996; 30 years ago in New Delhi, India
- Headquarters: Munich, Germany
- Revenue: €1 billion (2023)
- Number of employees: 17,695 (2024)
- Website: www.nagarro.com

Nagarro SE is a German IT service provider based in Munich, Bavaria, Germany. The company's activities include digital products and IT services, particularly for the automotive, energy and telecommunications industries.

== History ==
Nagarro was founded in 1996 in New Delhi, India, by a team led by Manas Fuloria. Fuloria merged two small companies, named the new venture after a word in a Robert Ludlum book, and commenced operations from a small office in the city.

In 2011, Nagarro was acquired by the German IT consulting company Allgeier SE; Nagarro was headquartered in Silicon Valley, United States, at the time of the acquisition.

In 2020, the company was spun-off from Allegier SE and listed on the Frankfurt Stock Exchange. Nagarro was included in the SDAX index in June 2021 and in the TecDAX of Deutsche Börse in December 2021.

In June 2026, Indian digital engineering company Persistent Systems announced its bid to acquire Nagarro for €1.1 billion.

== Products and sectors ==
Nagarro SE primarily designs, develops and implements software for industry in cases where no standard software available on the market is suitable. The company uses the term digital product engineering for this purpose. In addition to the automotive, energy and telecommunications industries, the company also targets banks and insurance companies, public administration, media and computer game developers, among others.

== Personnel and locations ==
In 2024, Nagarro had around 18,000 employees, of which over 13,000 were in India. Its other employees were spread across 36 countries in Europe, Asia and North America.

== Finances ==
The key trends for Nagarro SE are, as of each financial year:

Year	2017	2018	2019	2020	2021	2022	2023
Total revenue (€ mn.)	211	287	402	430	546	856	>1000
Net profit (€ mn.)	3	7	25	18	30	77	...
Total Assets (€ mn.)	167	298	343	388	526	621	...
Number of employees	...	...	8,406	8,666	13,684	18,250	18,000
