= Allgeier SE =

Information technology services company

- Type: Societas Europaea
- ISIN: DE000A2GS633
- Industry: IT services, Software
- Founded: 1977; 49 years ago
- Headquarters: Munich, Germany
- Revenue: €480 million (2022)
- Number of employees: 3,329 (2022)
- Website: www.allgeier.com

Allgeier SE is the holding company of an international technology group in the IT and software services sector. Its headquarters are in Munich. The Group has around fifty branches in German-speaking countries as well as offices in France, Spain, Portugal, Poland, the Czech Republic, India, Vietnam and the US. The Group has around 2,500 software developers.

Its business activities focus on software and IT services as well as system integration, including in particular services for standard business solutions from Microsoft, SAP, IBM and Oracle for customer companies in Allgeier's "Enterprise IT" division. In the 2010s, the Group expanded its IT consulting and IT services division with "mgm technology partners" and the development and sale of customized software solutions has become a main area of business. Another business is the provision of temporary staff and freelancers in the "Allgeier Experts" division.

== History ==
In 1977, Robert Allgeier Sr. and B-O-G Bremen Büro-Organisation-GmbH founded Allgeier Computer GmbH, based in Bremen. This was followed in the 1980s by the founding of subsidiaries in the Netherlands, Belgium, France, Great Britain and the United States.

On May 19, 1998, the former GmbH changed its name to Allgeier Computer AG. With effect from December 16 of the same year, the founding company and sole shareholder B-O-G Bremen Büro-Organisation-GmbH merged with Allgeier Computer AG. The shares previously held by the company were transferred to the founder Robert Allgeier senior.

Old Logo

Allgeier Computer AG went public on July 11, 2000. In 2002, the headquarters were moved to Munich and the company was renamed Allgeier Holding AG in 2003.

Following a resolution passed by the Annual General Meeting of the company on June 21, 2011, and with effect from May 3, 2012, the company was converted into a European Company (SE) and has since been traded as Allgeier SE.

On December 15, 2020, the global software development business bundled in Nagarro SE was fully spun off and has since been operated as an independent company listed on the stock exchange.

== Company ==
Allgeier designs, implements and operates complete IT solutions based on standard business software products as well as its own software solutions and individual software development. The group of companies has 51 locations in Europe, Asia and America. The shares are listed on the Frankfurt Stock Exchange in the CDAX index.

The Allgeier SE Group is divided into several divisions with the following individual companies in particular (as of May 2023):

=== Enterprise IT ===
- Allgeier Public SE
- Allgeier Enterprise Services SE (former Allgeier Experts SE)
- Allgeier IT GmbH
- Allgeier IT Projects GmbH
- Allgeier IT Business GmbH
- Allgeier IT Services GmbH
- Allgeier Engineering GmbH
- publicplan GmbH
- Höhn Consulting GmbH
- Allgeier Enterprise Services AG
- Allgeier Inovar GmbH
- Allgeier (Schweiz) AG
- Allgeier CyRis GmbH
- Allgeier Secion GmbH
- Allgeier Experts GmbH
- Allgeier Experts Consulting GmbH
- U.N.P. – Software GmbH
- U.N.P. – HRSolutions GmbH
- Evora IT Solutions Group GmbH

=== mgm technology partners ===
- mgm technology partners GmbH
- mgm consulting partners GmbH
- mgm security partners GmbH
- mgm technology partners Schweiz AG
- mgm technology partners Vietnam Co. Ltd.
- mgm technology partners USA Corp.
- mgm technology partners eurl
- mgm technology partners s.r.o.
