= Energiekontor =

German renewable energy company

Energiekontor AG
- Company type: public
- Traded as: SDAX
- ISIN: DE0005313506
- Genre: Renewable Energy
- Founded: 1990
- Founder: Günter Lammers; Bodo Wilkens
- Headquarters: Bremen, Germany
- Area served: Germany, United Kingdom, Portugal, Netherlands
- Key people: Bodo Wilkens (Chairman of the Supervisory Board); Peter Szabo (CEO); Günter Eschen; Torben Möller
- Revenue: ▼€ 149.9 mio (2017)
- Net income: ▼€ 11.9 mio (2017)
- Total assets: ▲€ 361.7 mio (2017)
- Total equity: ▲€ 70.2 mio (2017)
- Owner: Bodo Wilkens & Günter Lammers (51.5 %); Public float (48.5 %)
- Number of employees: 139
- Divisions: Project Development, Power Generation, Operational Development & Innovation
- Website: www.energiekontor.de status: April 2018

Energiekontor is a German company specialized in the development and management of wind farms and solar parks. The main activities are concentrated in Germany, Portugal and in the United Kingdom. The company sells developed facilities or takes the ownership. Energiekontor manages external wind farms for clients as well.

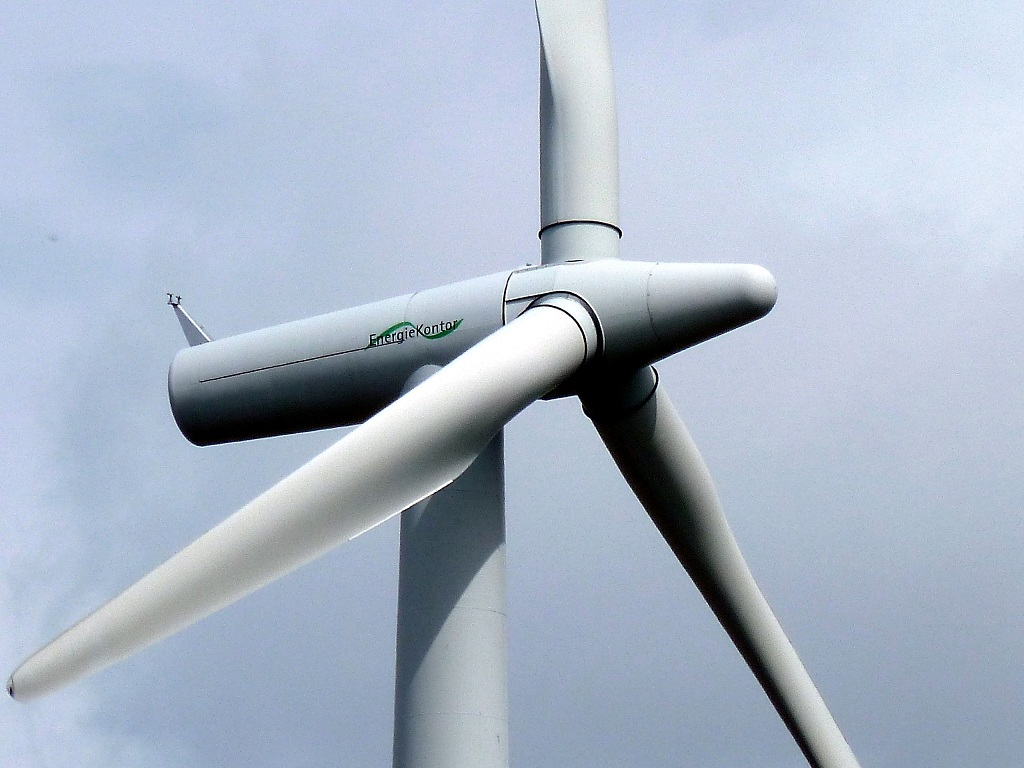
Wind turbine of a German wind farm developed by Energiekontor

== Achievements and market presence ==
Until May 2018, Energiekontor had built 118 wind farms with a total rated power of nearly 940 MW. The electricity generated by this facilities amounts to ca. 2 billion kWh per year which comes up to the demand of more than 600,000 households. The capital invested totals more than €1.6 billion.

Energiekontor itself owns and operates 34 wind farms and one solar park with a total rated power of nearly 259 MW in Germany, Portugal and in the UK (end of 2017). In addition to its headquarters in Bremen, the company has five offices in West, North and East Germany. Branch offices were established in Leeds (England), Glasgow (Scotland), Lisbon (Portugal), Nijmegen (Netherlands), Austin/Texas (US) and Toulouse (France).

== Innovation ==
Energiekontor also develops new technologies and methods to improve efficiency and reliability of wind power facilities. Particular importance has been the Rotor Blade Extension (RBE), presented in 2009 together with the university of Bremerhaven. By increasing the rotor diameter with an additional modular segment that is applied over the blade tip, yield grows significantly. The extension modules for two AN Bonus turbines (1.0 and 1.3 MW) are specified with an Annual Energy Production (AEP) increase of 5 to 7%. Energiekontor indicates a payback period of three years and recommends the solution as an alternative to repowering especially in countries with limited grid access. In December 2016, the company announced a new prototype for GE 1.5sl turbines (1.5 MW) with an expected AEP increase of around 9.5%.

== History ==
Energiekontor was founded in 1990 by Bodo Wilkens and Günter Lammers on the basis of the German Electricity Feed-in Act, a precursor of the Renewable Energy Sources Act (EEG). The first two wind farms, located in Lower Saxony, were built in 1994. In 2000, Energiekontor had a track record of around 200 MW and went public. In 2005, the first wind farm in UK was taken into operation.

Beginning in the late 1990s, Energiekontor also developed two offshore wind farms in the German North Sea. Borkum Riffgrund West was approved in 2004, Nordergründe in 2007. The rights for these projects were sold between 2011 and 2014 to DONG Energy and wpd. Thereby, the company carried out its pull back from all offshore activities.

In 2010, Energiekontor started to develop solar parks with photovoltaic panels. In 2016, the company entered the Dutch market. In 2017, further market entries followed in France and in the US.
