= KSB SE & Co. KGaA =

German multinational manufacturer

- Trade name: SE, Kommanditgesellschaft auf Aktien
- Traded as: SDAX
- Industry: Mechanical engineering
- Predecessor: Amag-Hilpert-Pegnitzhütte
- Founded: 1871
- Headquarters: Frankenthal (Rhineland-Palatinate), Germany
- Area served: Worldwide
- Key people: Stephan Timmermann, CEO; Stephan Bross, CTO; Ralf Kannefass, CSO; Matthias Schmitz, CFO
- Products: Pumps, valves and related services for industrial applications, building services, water and waste water management as well as energy and mining processes
- Revenue: 2.25 Billion Euro (2018)
- Number of employees: 15,713 (2018)
- Website: ksb.com

KSB SE & Co. KGaA is a German multinational manufacturer of pumps, valves with headquarters in Frankenthal (Pfalz), Germany. The KSB Group has manufacturing plants, sales and marketing organizations, and service operations on every continent except Antarctica.

== 1896-1945 ==
The mechanical engineer, Johannes Klein, received a patent in 1871 on the boiler feed apparatus he invented, and founded Frankenthaler Maschinen- & Armatur-Fabrik Klein, Schanzlin & Becker with Friedrich Schanzlin and Jakob Becker. From 1887 the company operated as an Aktiengesellschaft (public limited company) with Johannes Klein at its head.

KSB’s first subsidiary outside Germany was founded in Great Britain in 1896, managed by Jacob Klein, the younger brother of Johannes Klein. Between 1924 and 1934 KSB acquired further plants in Germany and set up European subsidiaries. KSB Compañía Sudamericana de Bombas in Argentina was KSB's first subsidiary in the Americas and commenced operations in 1941. During the Second World War, KSB was a major supplier to the armaments industry in the Third Reich and played a key role in the development and manufacture of turbopumps for the V2 rocket.

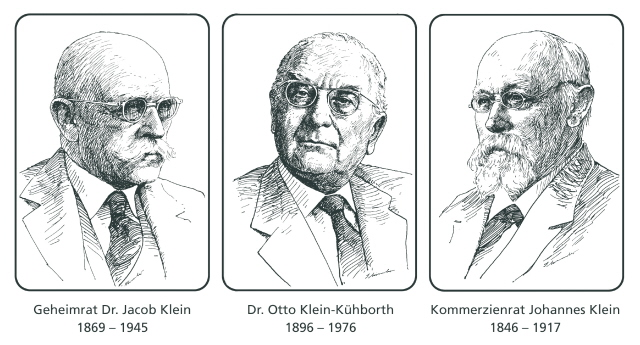
Key people in the company's history

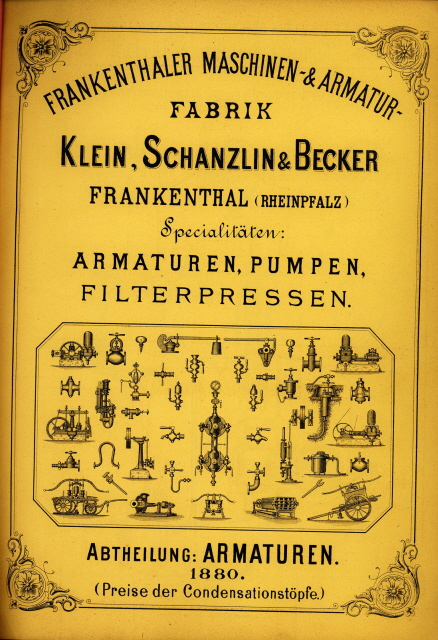
KSB price list from 1880

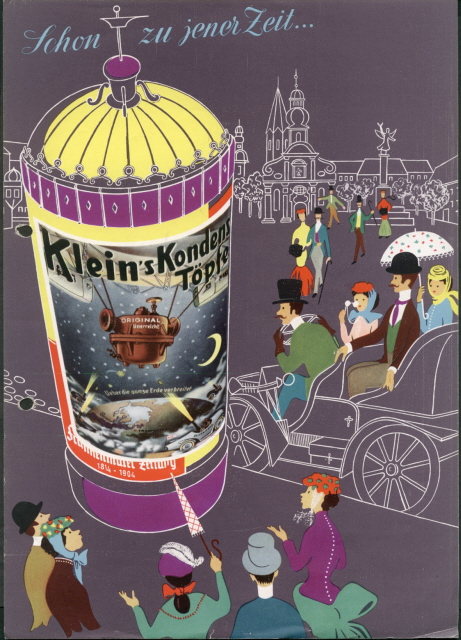
Historical advertising

== From 1945-2019 ==
The company's first Asian-Pacific subsidiary was set up in Pakistan in 1953. The companies of Pumpen AG (Homburg), Kleinschanzlin-Bestenbostel (Bremen) and AMAG-Hilpert-Pegnitzhütte AG (Nuremberg/Pegnitz) were amalgamated into Klein, Schanzlin & Becker AG.

In 1960 the KSB-Stiftung (KSB Foundation) was set up with stated aims of encouraging research in the natural sciences and supporting education in technology, natural science and economics. Otto Klein-Kühborth transferred a qualified majority holding of the company's share capital to the KSB-Stiftung (KSB Foundation) in 1964.

KSB took over French pump manufacturer, Paris-based Pompes Guinard S.A., in 1986 and acquired the world’s second-largest butterfly valve manufacturer, Paris-based Amri S.A., Paris, in 1989. In 1988 KSB entered the slurry pumps market with the acquisition of GIW Industries, Inc., Grovetown, USA. In 1990 KSB consolidated the eastern German Hallesche Pumpenwerke GmbH as part of the overall AG. The joint venture KSB Shanghai Pumps Co. Ltd. was founded in 1994. MIL Controls Ltd., Mala (Kerala), India, producer of ANSI valves and control valves, was acquired years later.

In 2003 KSB took over Dutch pump supplier DP industries B.V., producer of pumps made of deep-drawn stainless sheet steel for building services and industrial applications. In the same year, KSB acquired a majority interest in Bombas ITUR, S.A. of Zarautz, Spain, with sales in industry, building services and marine applications . KSB establishes Dalian KSB AMRI Valves Co. Ltd. in the Chinese foreign trade zone in 2004, specialising in the manufacture and assembly of butterfly valves for industrial and building services applications. One year later, KSB acquired the valve business of IVC S/A Indústria de Válvulas e Controles, a Brazilian company whose products are primarily employed in the oil and gas industry, in power stations, paper mills and other industrial applications.

In 2006 KSB received an order for valves to the value of roughly €17 million, its largest valves contract. In December 2006, the 60,000th Eta pump leaves the factory.

In 2007 the Supervisory Board approves a large investment to construct of new halls and modern production and test facilities at the Frankenthal and Halle sites. KSB’s Microchem is the first centrifugal pump for handling the very small quantities in micro-process engineering applications.

In 2008 KSB establishes joint ventures with two Asian companies. The German-Japanese cooperation Nikkiso-KSB GmbH develops and sells canned motor pumps for the European and Middle Eastern markets. The German-Chinese joint venture company Shanghai Electric-KSB Nuclear Pumps and Valves Co. manufactures safety-relevant pumps and valves for the Chinese nuclear power station market.

The German-Chinese joint venture SEC-KSB Nuclear Pumps and Valves Co. Ltd. starts constructing a factory construction in Lingang, near Shanghai, in 2009. 125 employees produce pumps, and later valves, for Chinese nuclear power stations.

In 2010 KSB acquired an 80 percent interest in ITACO s.r.l., an Italian drive specialist, producer of a new kind of energy-efficient motor. The South Korean company Seil Seres Co. Ltd. makes valves for marine applications.

In 2016 KSB AMRI, Inc. was acquired by Bray International, Inc. The acquisition included AMRI's production site and employees as well as the ACRIS and AMRESIST brands.

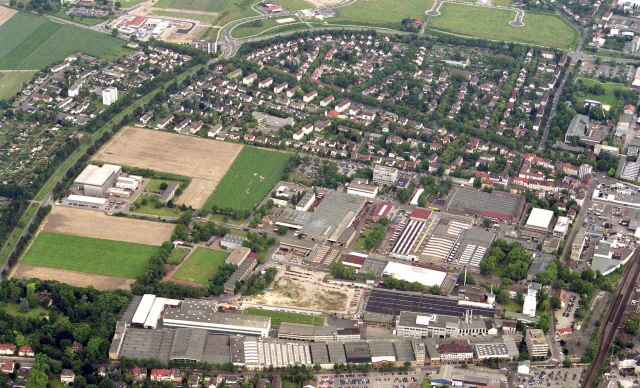
Site in Frankenthal

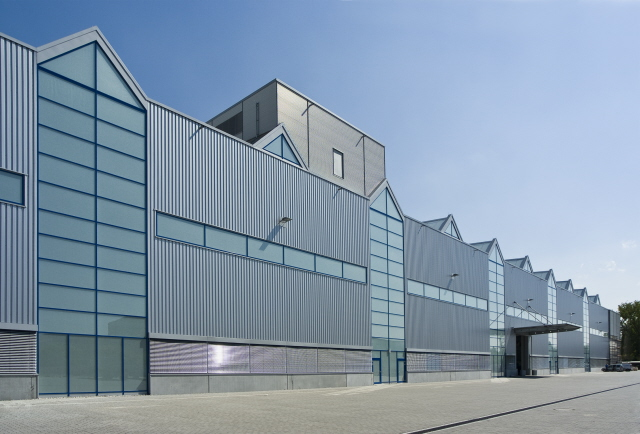
Production hall and test facility for large products at the Frankenthal site

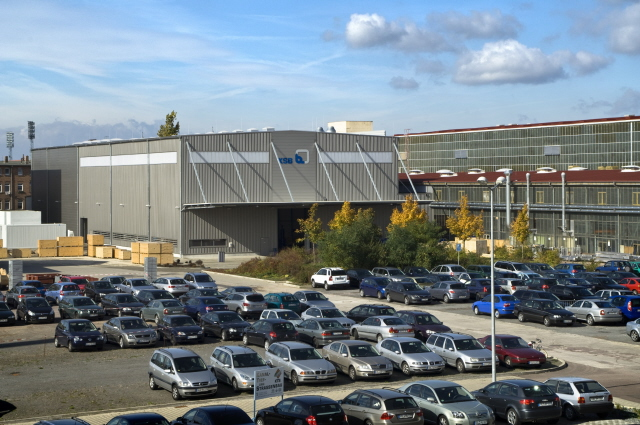
Site in Halle (Saale)

== Market and locations ==
Within the KSB Group, centrifugal pumps account for around two thirds of sales revenue. These pumps, as well as valves, are sold to engineering contractors, OEMs and end users or, in some cases, distributed via dealers. The same applies to control and monitoring systems, and to package units with pumps and valves.

The best developed sales market for these products is Europe, where KSB operates its main manufacturing facilities in Germany and France. KSB AG’s main plant in Frankenthal is its largest in Europe, ahead of the production sites in Pegnitz (Bavaria) and Halle (Saxony-Anhalt) in Germany, and La Roche-Chalais in France.

The second-largest market for KSB products is the Region Asia, followed by the Region Americas/Oceania and the Region Middle East/Africa. Outside Europe, KSB’s biggest manufacturing plants are in Brazil, China, India and the USA.

KSB manufactures products and components in a total of 16 countries; they are sold through the Group’s own companies or agencies in more than 100 countries. With their products, the Group companies serve customers in industry including the chemical and petrochemical industries, customers in the energy and construction/building services sectors, transport equipment manufacturers and operators (e.g. ships, rail vehicles), water and waste water utilities, and mining companies. Once again in 2015, the top-selling markets for their products were the industrial and energy supply sectors.
