= Wüstenrot Bank =

Bank based in Ludwigsburg, Germany

Coordinates: 48.88331°N 9.189827°E

Wüstenrot Bank AG Pfandbriefbank
- Industry: Direct bank
- Founded: 1968
- Headquarters: Ludwigsburg, Germany
- Total assets: €1.513 billion (2017)
- Number of employees: >120 (2017)
- Parent: Wüstenrot & Württembergische AG

The Wüstenrot Bank AG Pfandbriefbank was a German bank based in Ludwigsburg. As a branchless direct bank, it offered checking accounts, payment cards and securities trading.

== Company History ==
On 9 August 1968, the Wüstenrot Bank AG for Housing was registered in the commercial register at the district court Ludwigsburg. The main task of the bank at that time was to support the customers of the Bausparkasse in financing their real estate projects. Later, the entire non-collective deposit business was taken over by the Bausparkasse.

In 1985, the construction of the first 10 bank branches began. In 1988 there were already 34 branches with 300 employees on the ground, and the range was expanded to include all forms of money and asset formation, current account payments, personal loans and securities transactions. The bank's name was also shortened to Wüstenrot Bank AG.

However, the field service - especially the Wüstenrot Bausparkasse - saw the branches increasingly as competitors. The bank's sales did not perform as expected and lacked the necessary returns. In 1990, a reorganization took place centralizing all administrative tasks in the central administration and new, cheaper locations for the remaining branches were sought after. At the end of 2002 the last branch was dissolved.

In 2005, the Wüstenrot Bank AG merged with Wüstenrot Hypothekenbank to form Wüstenrot Bank AG Pfandbriefbank. It became one of the first universal banks with mortgage bond license under the new law.

On June 1, 2017, the parent company Wüstenrot & Württembergische AG announced that a sale of the bank would be considered. At the end of March 2018, the sale was made to Bremer Kreditbank.

== Affiliation ==
Client funds are secured by the Deposit Guarantee Fund of the Federal Association of German Banks and Entschädigungseinrichtung deutscher Banken. Since 2017, online banking has been offered in cooperation with GAD, which was previously an in-house development. Furthermore, the Wüstenrot ATMs are connected to CashPool.

== See also ==
- List of banks in Germany
