= Birkenfeld (Enz) =

German municipality

- Municipality
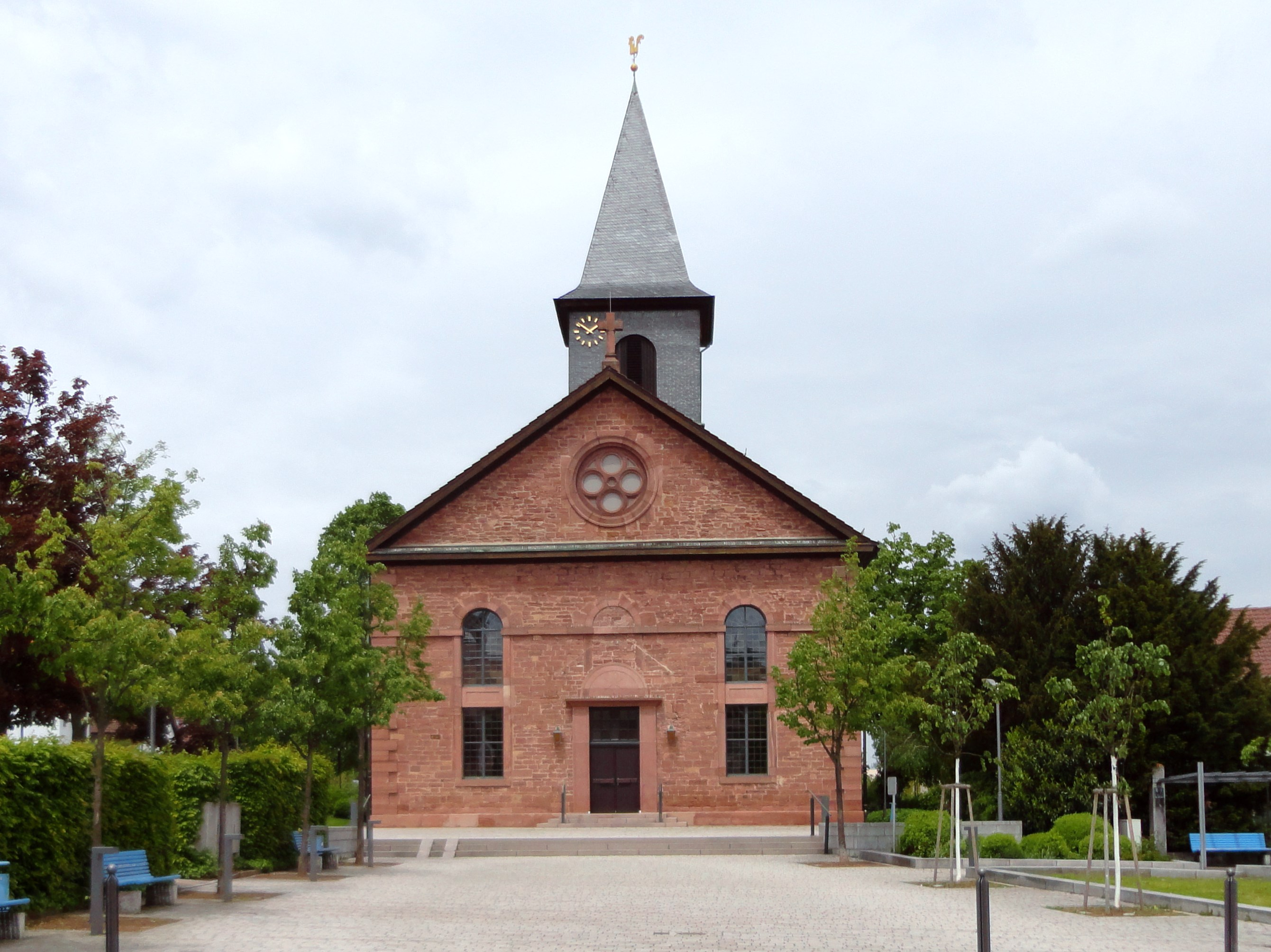
- Birkenfeld Church

- Coat of arms

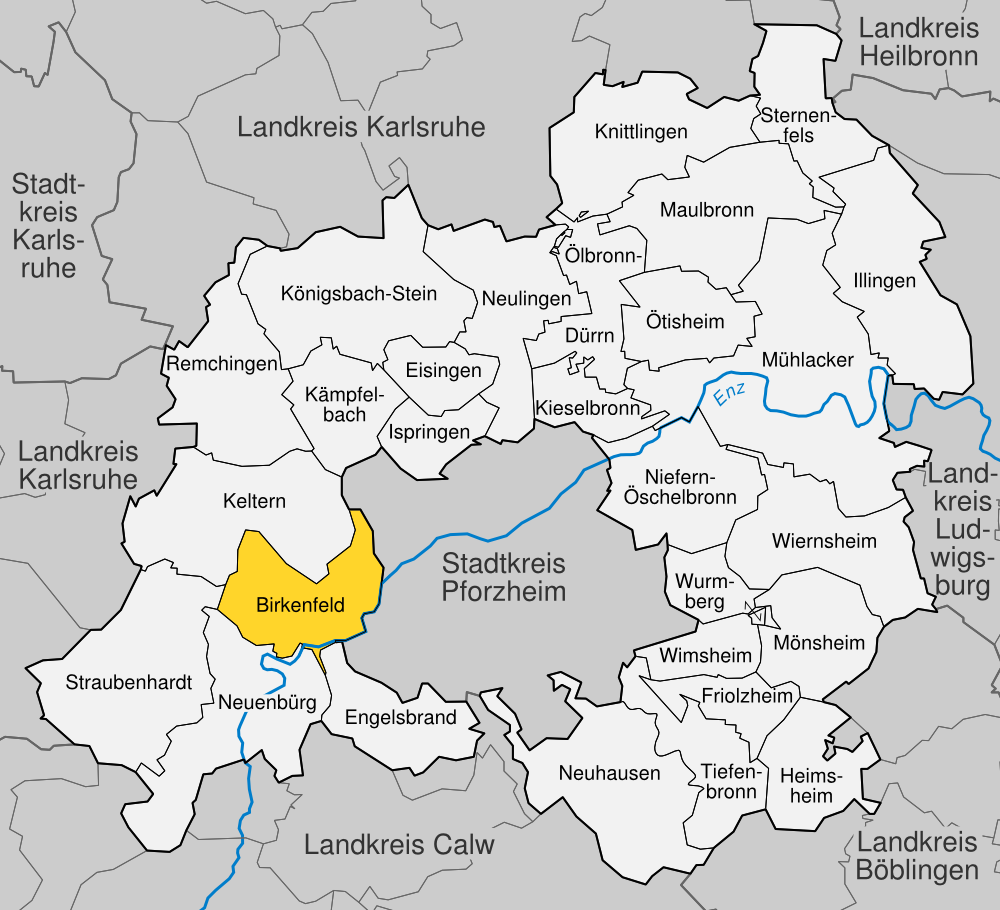
- Location of Birkenfeld within Enzkreis district
- Interactive map of Birkenfeld
- Location within Germany Location within Baden-Württemberg
- Coordinates: 48°52′11″N 8°38′10″E
- Country: Germany
- State: Baden-Württemberg
- Admin. region: Karlsruhe
- District: Enzkreis

Area
  - Total: 19.04 km^{2} (7.35 sq mi)
- Elevation: 352 m (1,155 ft)

Population (2025-12-31)
  - Total: 10,134
  - Density: 532.2/km^{2} (1,379/sq mi)
- Time zone: UTC+01:00 (CET)
  - Summer (DST): UTC+02:00 (CEST)
- Postal codes: 75217
- Dialling codes: 07231
- Vehicle registration: PF
- Website: www.birkenfeld-enzkreis.de

Birkenfeld (German pronunciation: [ˈbɪʁkn̩fɛlt]) is a municipality in the Enz district, in Baden-Württemberg, Germany. It is situated in the Northern Black Forest, 6 km southwest of Pforzheim. The town is located on the top plain, the area extends down to the river Enz valley.

Birkenfeld has a stop on route S6 of the Karlsruhe Stadtbahn, which operates over the Enztalbahn railway.

== Geography ==
Birkenfeld is located about 7 kilometers (4.3 mi) from Pforzheim in the Enz river valley at an elevation of 260 m (850 ft) to 352 m (1,155 ft) meters above sea level (NHN). Birkenfeld borders Pforzeim and the Enzkreis municipalities of Keltern, Straubenhardt, Neuenbürg and Engelsbrand.

The former municipality of Gräfenhausen falls within Birkenfeld, therefore placing the villages Gräfenhausen and Obernhausen within Birkenfeld.

== History ==
The earliest known history in Birkenfeld is to be found in grave finds in a Celtic settlement in the municipality dated to 400 BC. Around 100 AD, the area came under the control of the Roman Empire and a Roman estate was built nearby. Birkenfeld was inhabited from 500 AD by the Alemanni and then the Franks.

Birkenfeld is first mentioned in a 1302 document. Twenty years it came under the control of the County of Württemberg, at which time a mill was documented for the first time. The first school in the village was constructed in 1566. Though not destroyed during the Thirty Years' War, Birkenfeld was still plundered. When the Kingdom of Württemberg reorganized its administrative structure in 1810, the township was placed under Neuenbürg. Birkenfeld was connected to the traffic of Pforzheim when the Royal Württemberg State Railways opened the Enz Valley Railway in 1836. Its first industrial enterprise, a branch of Neuenbürg's scythe factory, opened in 1856. The district reform of 1938 under the Nazi Party placed Birkenfeld under the administration of Calw District. It then became part of the French Occupation Zone with the defeat of Nazi Germany. Two years later, it was assigned to the state of Württemberg-Hohenzollern which then joined the state of Baden-Württemberg with the formation of West Germany in 1952. Birkenfeld became part of Enzkreis with the 1973 Baden-Württemberg district reforms.

== Economy ==
Stratec Biomedical Systems has their headquarters in Birkenfeld, as well as Müller Group slaughterhouses.
