= Brunnthal =

- Municipality
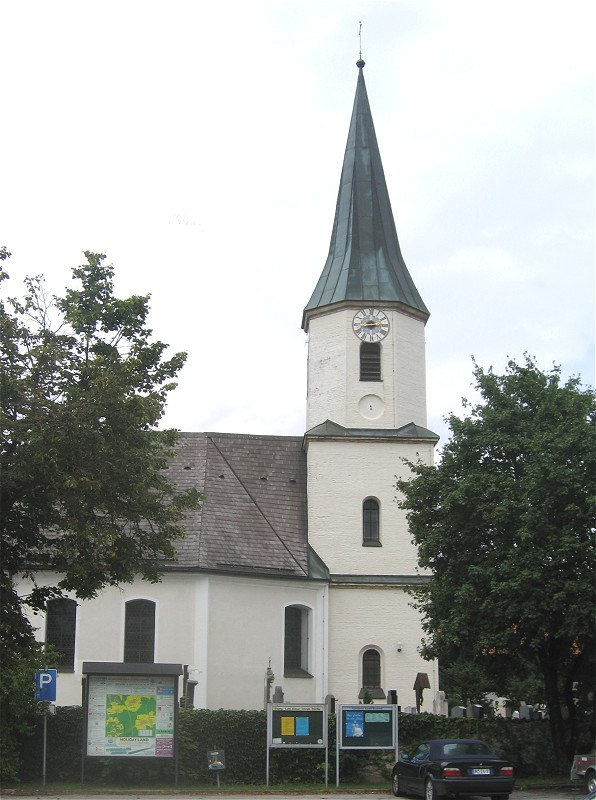
- Saint Nicholas Church

- Coat of arms

- Location of Brunnthal within Munich district
- Interactive map of Brunnthal
- Location within Germany Location within Bavaria
- Coordinates: 48°1′N 11°41′E
- Country: Germany
- State: Bavaria
- Admin. region: Oberbayern
- District: Munich

Government
  - Mayor (2020–26): Stefan Kern (CSU)

Area
  - Total: 37.95 km^{2} (14.65 sq mi)
- Elevation: 592 m (1,942 ft)

Population (2025-12-31)
  - Total: 5,500
  - Density: 140/km^{2} (380/sq mi)
- Time zone: UTC+01:00 (CET)
  - Summer (DST): UTC+02:00 (CEST)
- Postal codes: 85649
- Dialling codes: 08102, 08104
- Vehicle registration: M
- Website: www.brunnthal.de

Brunnthal (German pronunciation: [ˈbʁʊntaːl]) is a municipality in the district of Munich in Bavaria in Germany.
