= Wüstenrot & Württembergische =

German financial services company

Wüstenrot & Württembergische (W&W)
- Type: Joint-stock company
- Traded as: FWB: WUW; SDAX
- Industry: Financial services
- Founded: 1999
- Headquarters: Kornwestheim, Germany
- Key people: Jürgen Albert Junker (CEO))
- Products: Insurance, banking
- Net income: €4,07 billion
- Number of employees: 8,129
- Website: www.ww-ag.com

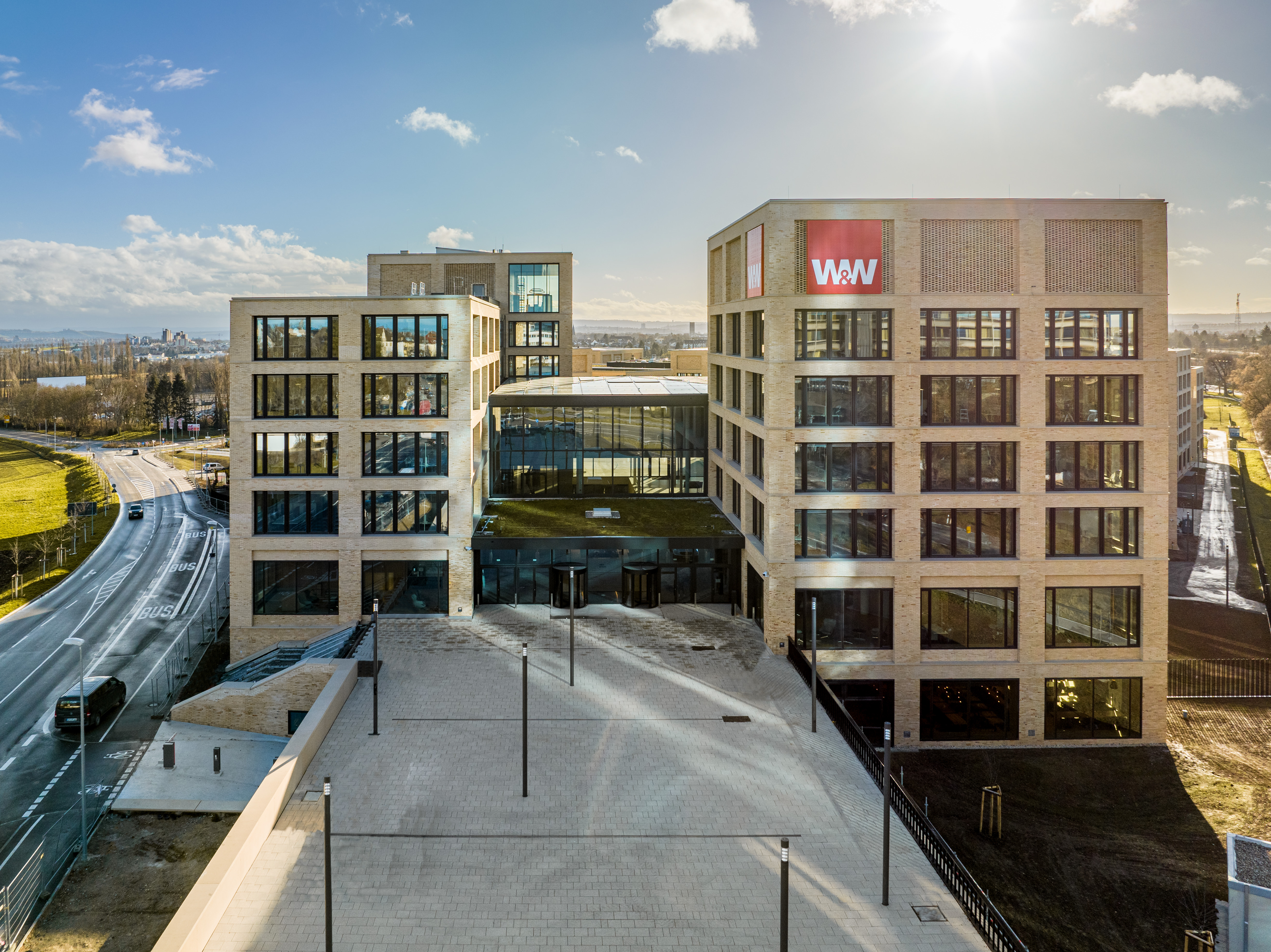
New headquarters in Kornwestheim (2023)

Wüstenrot & Württembergische (W&W) is a German financial services company that offers a range of products and services, including insurance, banking, and investment products. It based in Stuttgart founded in 1999. The Wüstenrot side of the business offers banking services. Württembergische offers insurance. W&W took over Karlsruher Versicherungsgruppe in 2005, thereby becoming one of Germany's top 15 insurance groups.

== History ==
Württembergische Versicherung was founded in 1828. The beginnings of the Gemeinschaft der Freunde Wüstenrot (GdF), today Wüstenrot Bausparkasse AG, date back to 1921. Their headquarters are in Ludwigsburg. It is the oldest building society in Germany. It was named after the small Swabian village of Wüstenrot, where the building society was founded.

In 1999, Wüstenrot merged with Württembergische. The merger to form Wüstenrot & Württembergische created one of the ten leading financial service providers in Germany. Other companies emerged from the merger, including W&W Informatik, which was founded in 2002. Wüstenrot Lebensversicherung was integrated into Württembergische Lebensversicherung in 2000.

In 2001, Wüstenrot Bausparkasse merged with Leonberger Bausparkasse to form the third largest private building society in Germany. In 2002, Allgemeine Rentenanstalt Lebensversicherung (ARA), in which unit-linked business was bundled, merged with Württembergische Lebensversicherung. In 2003, the securities management of the insurance companies was transferred to W&W Asset Management; the external reinsurance business of Wüstenrot & Württembergische was discontinued and Wüstenrot hypotečni banka was founded in Prague.

In 2005, Wüstenrot Bank and Wüstenrot Hypothekenbank merged to form Wüstenrot Bank AG Pfandbriefbank with headquarters in Ludwigsburg. It is one of the first universal banks with a Pfandbrief licence under new laws. In the same year, Wüstenrot & Württembergische acquired the Karlsruher Insurance Group. Following accounting irregularities and loss of market share (annual financial statements 2004 and 2005) a modernization course was launched in 2006 under the new chairman of the Board of Management, Alexander Erdland.

Since 2008, the W&W Group has presented itself with a newly developed, uniform image for both traditional brands. In mid-July 2009, Wüstenrot & Württembergische decided to increase its share capital by around EUR 30 million with new subscription rights for 5,749,538 new shares. The company's share capital thus increased to 481,067,777.39 Euro, divided into 91,992,622 no-par value registered shares. The share has been traded on the stock exchange since September 9, 1999. On September 13, 2009, the company's share capital was increased by around 30 million Euro. On 13 April 2010 it was announced that the financial group W&W would acquire Allianz Dresdner Bauspar via its subsidiary Wüstenrot Bausparkasse. In September 2010 it was merged into Wüstenrot Bausparkasse. The company has been listed on the SDAX since 21 March 2016.

It was announced on 3 April 2018 that the subsidiary Wüstenrot Bank would be sold to Bremer Kreditbank.

The company moved to a new office campus in Kornwestheim in 2023.

== See also ==
- List of banks in Germany
