= Allianz =

German multinational financial services company

Allianz SE

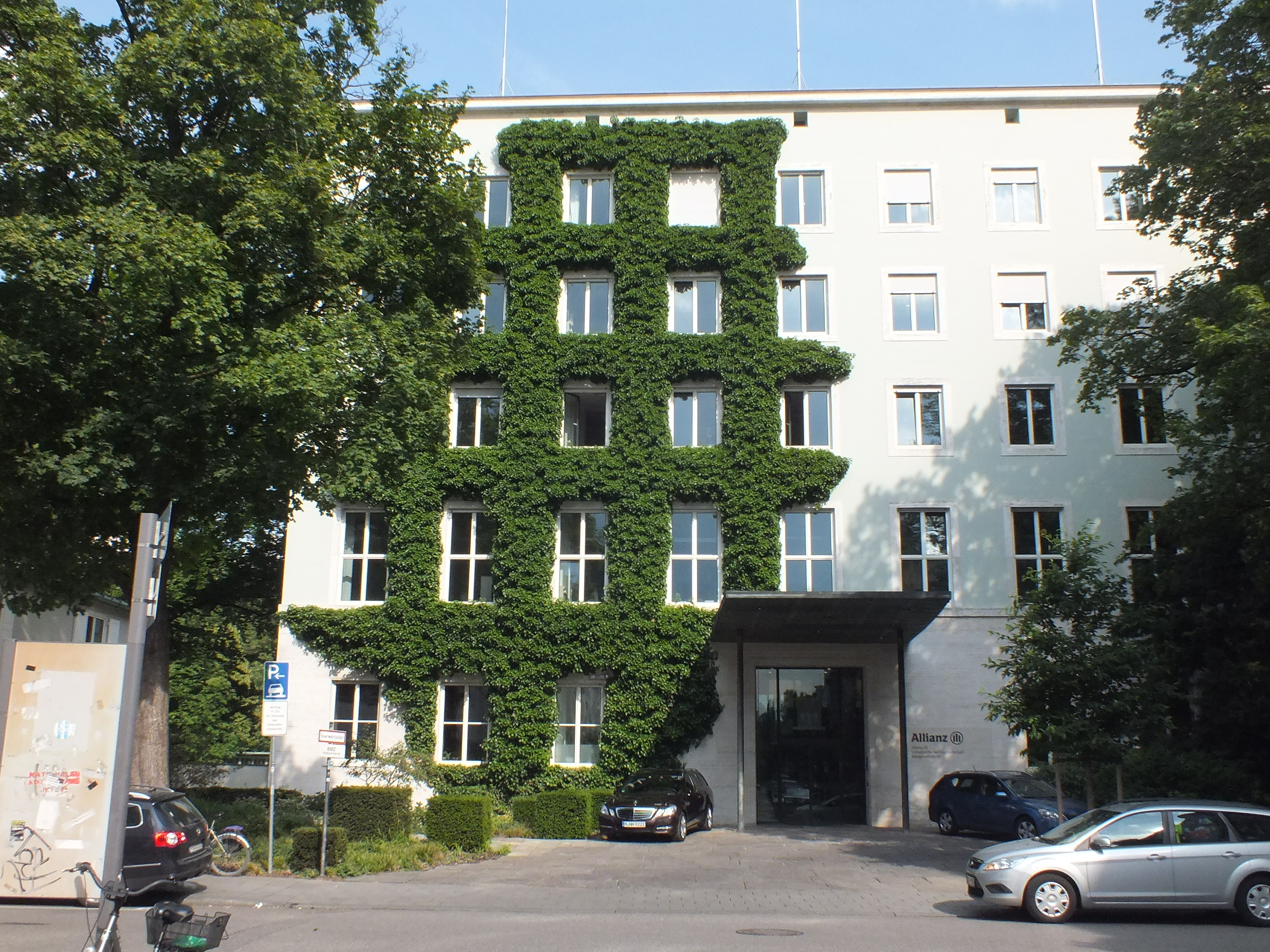
- Headquarters in Munich
- Type: Public
- Traded as: FWB: ALV; DAX component; EURO STOXX 50 component
- Industry: Financial services
- Founded: 5 February 1890; 136 years ago in Munich, Germany
- Founders: Carl von Thieme; Wilhelm von Finck
- Headquarters: Munich, Germany
- Area served: Worldwide
- Key people: Oliver Bäte (CEO); Michael Diekmann (chair, supervisory board)
- Services: Insurance; General insurance; Health insurance; Vehicle insurance; Travel insurance; Home insurance; Life insurance; Mortgage loans; Investment management; Asset management; Mutual funds
- Revenue: ▲€186.94 billion (2025)
- Operating income: ▲€17.37 billion (2025)
- Net income: ▲€11.43 billion (2025)
- AUM: ▲€2.512 trillion (2025)
- Total assets: ▼€1.024 trillion (2025)
- Total equity: ▲€63 billion (2025)
- Number of employees: 156,875 (2025)
- Subsidiaries: Allianz France; Allianz Global Investors; Allianz Life; Bajaj General; Allianz Trade; PIMCO
- Website: Allianz.com

Allianz SE (/ˈæliənts/ AL-ee-ənts; German: [aˈli̯ants]) is a German multinational financial services company headquartered in Munich, Germany. Its core businesses are insurance and asset management.

Allianz is the world's largest insurance company and the largest financial services company in Europe. In 2023, the company was ranked 37th in the Forbes Global 2000. Also it is a component of the Euro Stoxx 50 stock market index. Its asset management division, which consists of PIMCO and Allianz Global Investors, has €2,432 billion of assets under management (AUM), of which €1,775 billion are third-party assets (Q1 2021). Allianz sold Dresdner Bank to Commerzbank in November 2008. Allianz was a major supporter of the Nazi movement and was an insurer of the Auschwitz concentration camp.

== History ==
=== Foundation ===
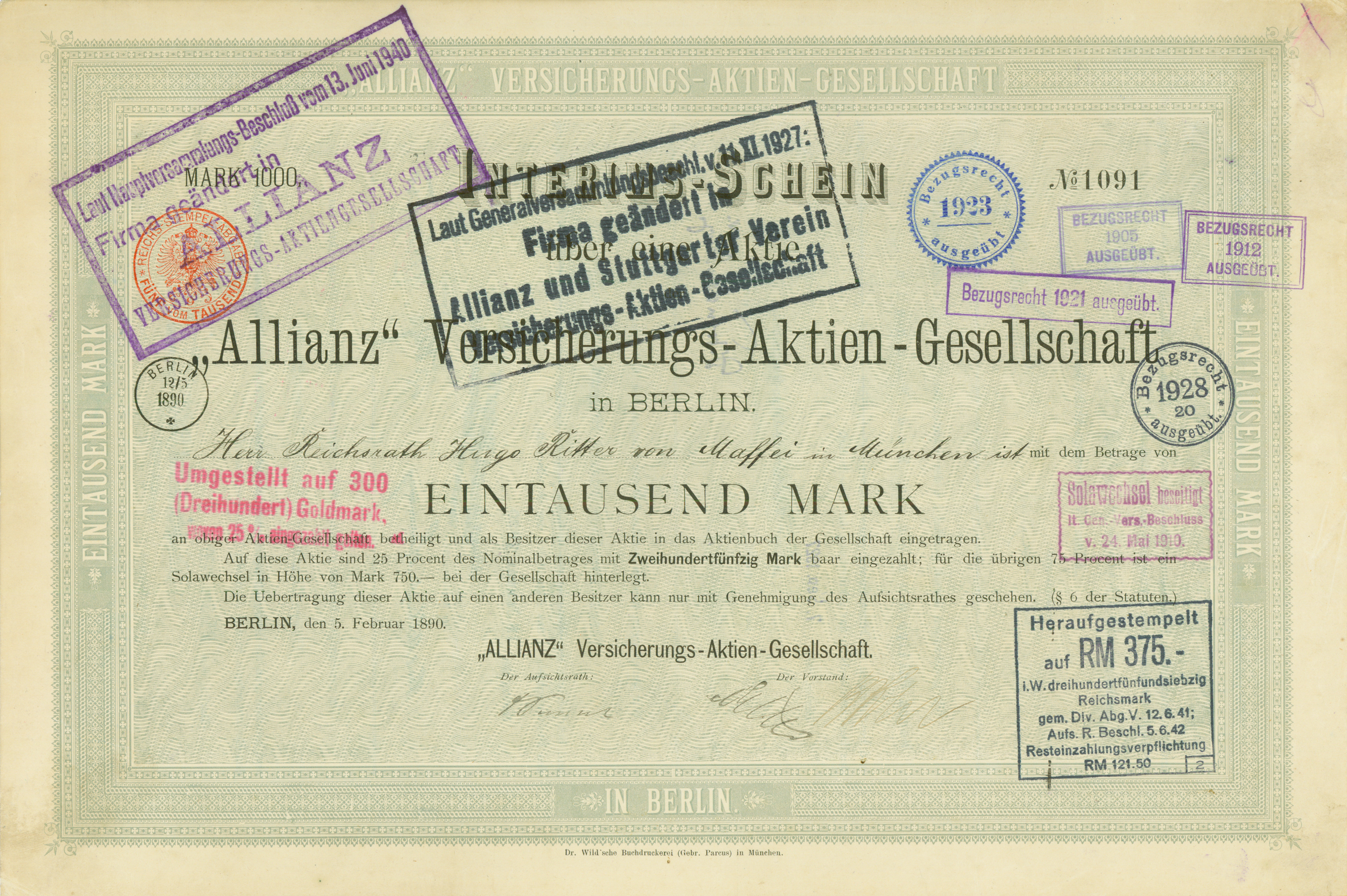
Share of the Allianz Versicherungs-AG, issued 5 February 1890

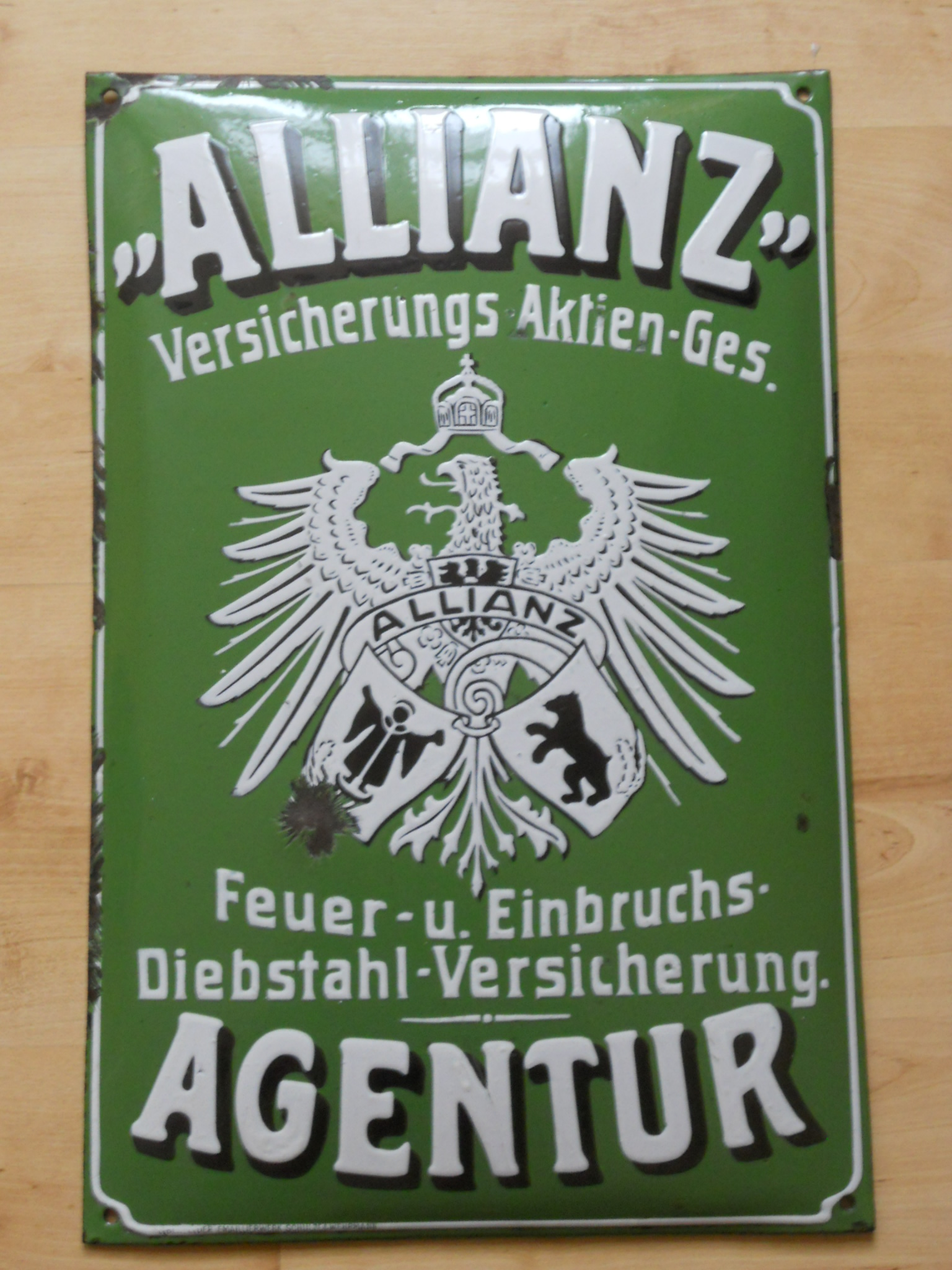
An early Allianz agent's plaque

Allianz AG was founded in Munich in 1889, but started its activities in Berlin on 5 February 1890, by the then-director of the Munich Reinsurance Company Carl von Thieme (a native of Erfurt, whose father was the director of the Thuringia insurance company) and Wilhelm von Finck (co-owner of the Merck Finck & Co. Bank). The joint company was listed in Berlin's trade register under the name Allianz Versicherungs-Aktiengesellschaft. The company was established with a start-up capital of 4 million marks. The first Allianz products were marine and accident policies that were initially sold only in Germany. However, in 1893, Allianz opened its first international branch office in London, distributing marine insurance coverage to German clientele looking for coverage abroad.

In 1900, the company became the first insurer to obtain a license to distribute corporate policies. In 1904, Paul von Naher took over the sole leadership of the company, as it moved into the US and other markets. Markets entered by 1914 included the Netherlands, Italy, Belgium, France, the Scandinavian countries and the Baltic states, and Allianz had become the largest maritime insurer in Germany. The company suffered an early disaster in expansion when the 1906 San Francisco earthquake caused the company to sustain 300,000 marks in losses. In 1905, the company acquired Fides Insurance Company, a firm that had innovated the first form of home invasion insurance. Other places expanded into during the 1910s and 1920s included Palestine, Cyprus, Iraq, China, the Dutch Indies (now Indonesia), Ceylon (now Sri Lanka), and Siam (now Thailand).

=== 20th-century developments ===
In 1905, the company began to offer fire insurance, and in 1911 it began to sell machinery breakdown policies. Allianz remained the only company in the world that sold machine breakdown insurance until 1924. In 1918, it began offering automobile insurance as well through a joint venture called Kraft Versicherungs-AG. In 1921, Von Naher died and was succeeded by Kurt Schmitt. The company would begin to offer life insurance as of 1922, becoming Europe's largest offerer of the policies by the end of the 1920s.

In 1927, Allianz merged with Stuttgarter Verein Versicherung AG, which was then the leading accident and third-party liability insurer. Two years later, it acquired the insurance businesses of Favag, a large German insurer that declared bankruptcy due to the onset of the Great Depression. Expansion of the company then slowed until 1938 at which point it employed more than 24,000 people. Christian Stadler wrote of the history of Allianz that it "shows how important it is to diversify into related areas to hedge against the risk of fundamental changes in markets and economies".

Allianz was a major supporter of the Nazi movement, and Hitler's first cabinet included the head of Allianz as a cabinet member. Allianz provided massive financial support at a crucial time for the expansion of the NSDAP. On 30 June 1933, Kurt Schmitt, Allianz Director-General, was appointed Economics Minister for Nazi Germany under Adolf Hitler and became an SS honorary member. He was a supporter of Aryanization and pushing out Jews from public life in Germany. He later received various honours from the SS including the Deaths Head and Iron Cross.

From 1933 to 1945, Allianz insured sub-organizations of the NSDAP and opened up new areas of business as the German Reich expanded. Among other things, the customer base was expanded through the takeover of Jewish insurance houses as part of the Aryanization initiative (seizing Jewish businesses to put in non-Jewish hands). Allianz profited directly from deportations. From 1940 onwards, Allianz insured SS armaments factories, prisoners' barracks, material stores and vehicle fleets in concentration camps, including Auschwitz, Buchenwald and Dachau. Allianz employees regularly inspected concentration camps.

During World War II, the Berlin headquarters of Allianz were destroyed by Allied bombing raids. Following the end of the war in 1945, Hans Heß became head of the company, and Allianz shifted its headquarters to Munich in 1949 due to the split between East and West Germany. Heß only held the position until 1948, when he was replaced by Hans Goudefroy. In 1956, Allianz became the first major European Insurance company to install a mainframe computer, taking delivery of a IBM 650 which provided cost savings within three years of delivery. After World War II, global business activities were gradually resumed. Allianz opened an office in Paris in 1959 and started repurchasing stakes in former subsidiaries in Italy and Austria. In 1971, Wolfgang Schieren became the head of the company.

These expansions were followed in the 1970s by the establishment of business in the United Kingdom, the Netherlands, Spain, Brazil and the United States. In 1986, Allianz acquired Cornhill Insurance in London, and the purchase of a stake in Riunione Adriatica di Sicurtà (RAS) in Milan, strengthened its presence in western and southern Europe in the 1980s.

In 1990, Allianz started an expansion into eight eastern European countries by establishing a presence in Hungary. In the same decade, Allianz also acquired Fireman's Fund, an insurer in the United States, which was followed by the purchase of Assurances Générales de France. These acquisitions were followed by the expansion into Asia with several joint ventures and acquisitions in China and South Korea and the acquisition of Australia's Manufacturers Mutual Insurance. Around this time, Allianz expanded its asset management business as well by purchasing asset management companies in California. In 1999, Allianz purchased investment management firm PIMCO for approximately US$3.3 billion.

=== 21st-century developments ===
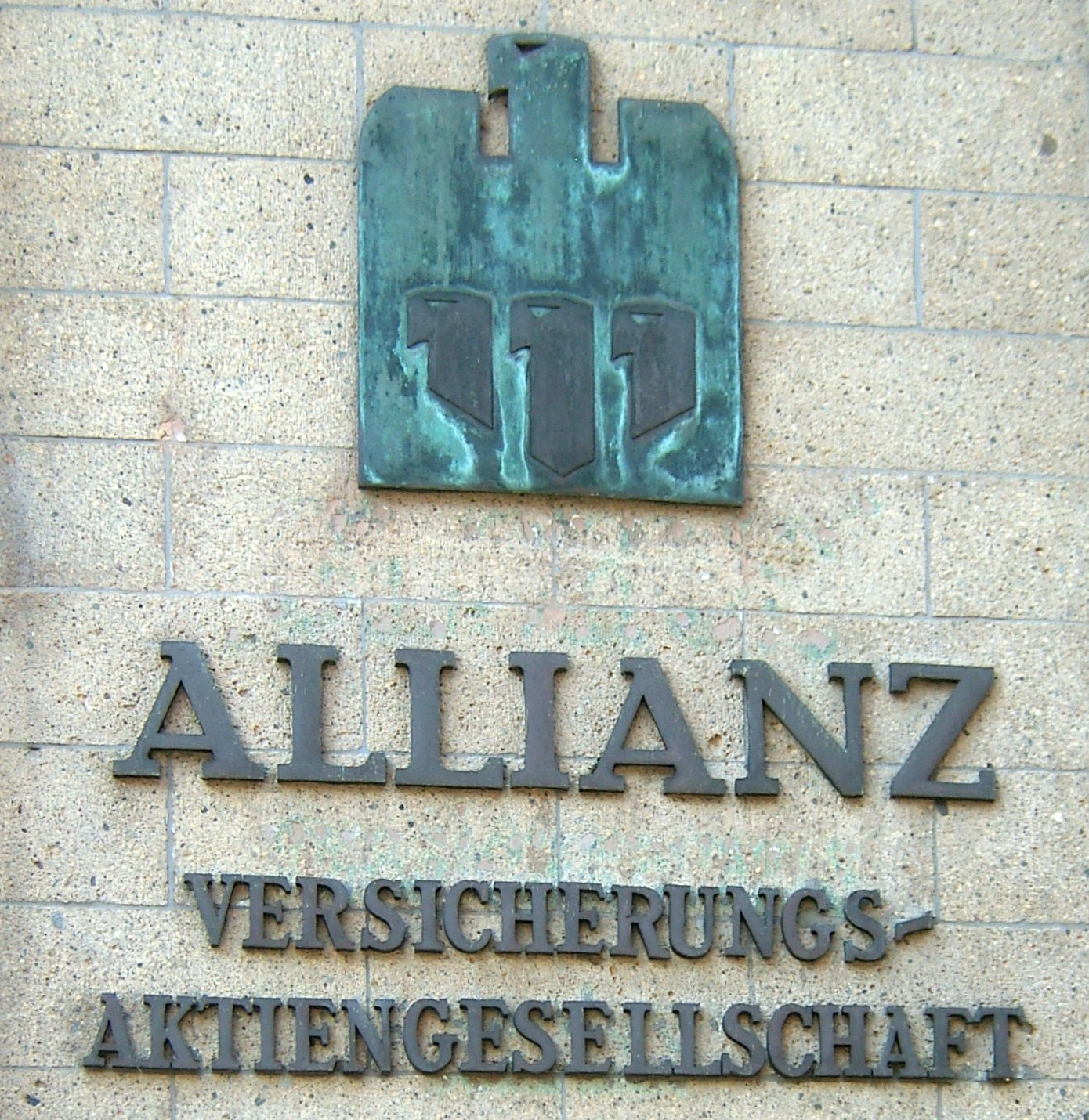
The original Allianz logo, designed in 1923 by Karl Schulpig

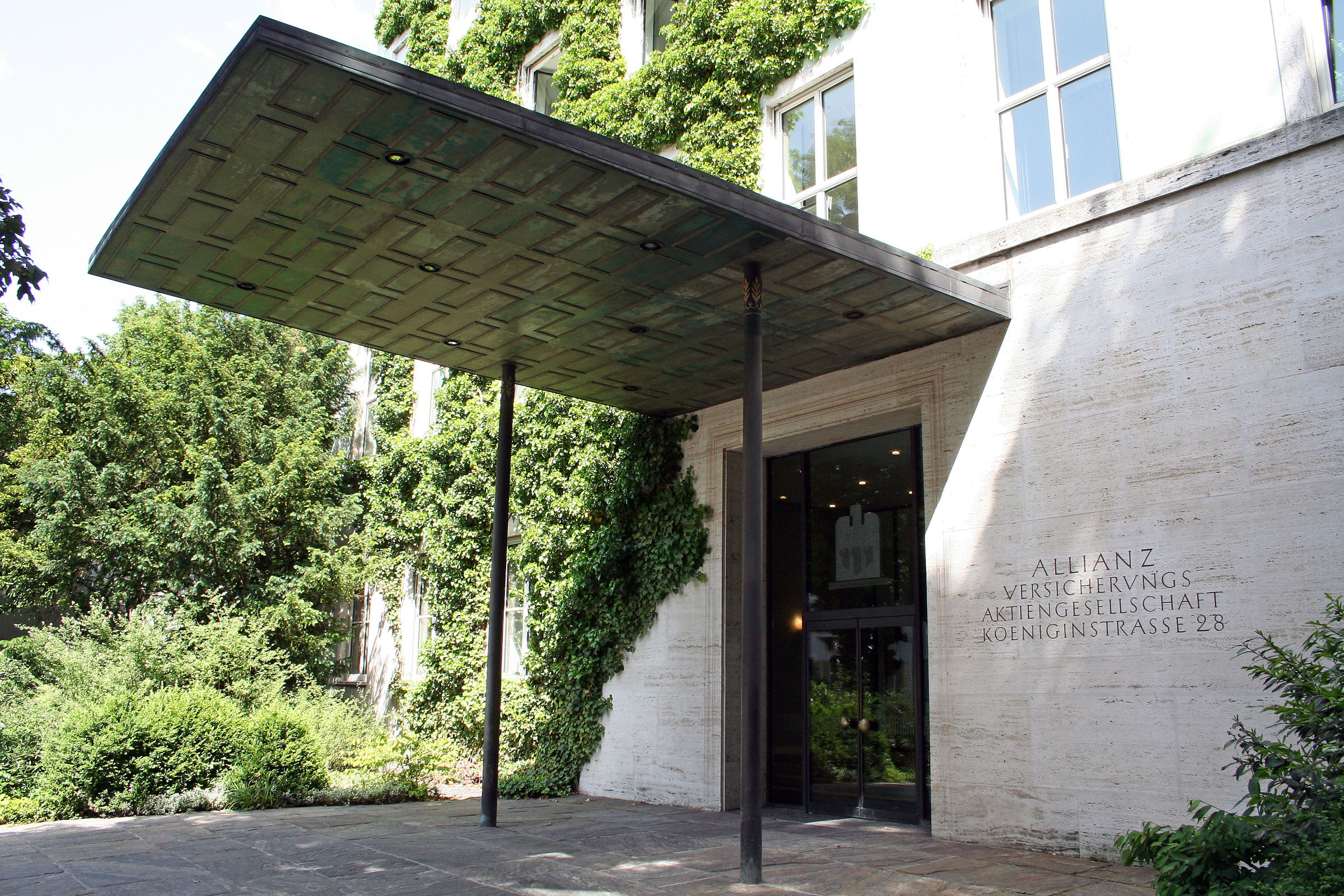
Allianz's current head office is located in Munich.

In April 2001, Allianz agreed to acquire the 80 per cent of Dresdner Bank that it did not already own, for US$20 billion. As part of the transaction, Allianz agreed to sell its 13.5 per cent stake in HypoVereinsbank to Munich Re and to acquire Munich Re's 40 per cent stake in Allianz Leben. Following the completion of the acquisition, Allianz and Dresdner Bank combined their asset management activities by forming Allianz Global Investors.

In 2002, Michael Diekmann succeeded Henning Schulte-Noelle as CEO. In June 2006, Allianz announced the layoff of 7,280 employees, about 4 percent of its worldwide workforce at the time, as part of a restructuring program aimed at raising profitability ("Allianz Sustainability P&C and Life"). The reductions comprised 5,000 staff members at Allianz insurance operations and 2,480 at Dresdner Bank. In the same month, Allianz announced that its Dresdner Kleinwort Wasserstein investment banking operation would be renamed as simply Dresdner Kleinwort.

In September 2005, Allianz announced that it would convert its holding company into a societas europaea. The conversion was made in conjunction with Allianz's acquisition of 100 per cent control of its principal Italian subsidiary Riunione Adriatica di Sicurtà for around US$7 billion. The conversion to an SE was completed on 13 October 2006. The Allianz Group also simplified its brand strategy from 2006 and their previous emblem was replaced by the current combination mark. By 2008 the company was Europe's largest insurer. In 2007, it was a founder member of the Hedge Fund Standards Board, which sets a voluntary code of standards of best practice endorsed by its members.

On 31 August 2008, it was announced that Allianz had agreed to sell 60.2 per cent of Dresdner Bank to Commerzbank for €9.8 billion (US$14.4 billion), with an agreement that Commerzbank would acquire the remainder of Dresdner Bank by the end of 2009. After renegotiations, it was announced in November 2008 that Commerzbank would acquire the 100% ownership of Dresdner Bank earlier (12 January 2009). The sale price was lowered to 5.5 billion Euro. Shortly after the transaction completed, Commerzbank was partially nationalized by the German government to save it from bankruptcy. Allianz currently retains a stake of around 14% in Commerzbank.

Allianz X, founded in 2013 and headed by Nazim Cetin, is Allianz's technology investment fund. In August 2015, a consortium led by Allianz acquired German motorway service station group Tank & Rast for an undisclosed sum believed to be in the region of €3.5 billion. In April 2018, TH Real Estate and Allianz partnered to provide £100m in debt finance to developers YardNine, for the development of 80 Fenchurch Street, a 240,000 sq ft office development in London. In October 2020, Allianz was named the world's top insurance brand by the Interbrand's Best Global Brands Ranking.

On 1 August 2021, Allianz disclosed that the United States Department of Justice had launched a probe into Allianz to determine the role that executives had played in the loss of billions of euros from Allianz Global's Structured Alpha Funds. In September 2021, the German Federal Financial Supervisory Authority launched its own probe. On September 30, 2021, it was reported that asset management chief Jacqueline Hunt would step down as part of a shake up that followed the investigations into the losses, staying on as a consultant to Bäte.

On 17 May 2022, Allianz SE has agreed to pay $6 billion in the U.S. fraud case due to the collapse of its Structured Alpha funds during the COVID-19 pandemic. In April 2023, Allianz put its 5% stake in fintech company N26 up for sale, with N26 valued at $3 billion (€2.7 billion). Meanwhile, N26 was valued at $9 billion at its last funding round in October 2021.

In December 2024, Allianz announced a withdrawal of its offer to acquire at least 51% of Singapore's Income Insurance which cost around $1.63 billion. This offer was initially put forward in July 2024 but later sparked criticism in Singapore as it concerned that it would detract from the mission of providing an affordable insurance for lower-income workers. The withdrawal came after the Singapore Government intervened to prevent the deal.

In June 2025, Allianz was included in a report by UN Special Rapporteur Francesca Albanese of companies supporting Israel's genocide in Gaza. Allianz rejected the accusation and maintained that a company cannot be held responsible for the actions of a sovereign government through lawful participation in global financial markets.

On 12 March 2026, Sunlife and Allianz began considering bids for HSBC Holdings' insurance unit, HSBC Life. A sale process was initiated in March, with non-binding bids materialising soon. In July 2026, HSBC announced that it would sell HSBC Life to Allianz for $2.09 Billion.

== Finances ==
Sales by business (2024)
Region	Share
Property/Casualty	69%
Life/Health	23%
Asset Management	8%

As of 2022, Allianz was the world's largest insurance company with US$1.02 trillion in assets according to Forbes. For the fiscal year 2022, Allianz reported earnings of €7.2 billion, with an annual revenue of €152.7 billion, an increase of 2.8% over the previous fiscal cycle.

Year	Revenue in bn. €	Net income in bn. €	Total assets in bn. €	Employees
2009	97.4	4.3		
2010	106.5	5.2		
2011	103.6	5.5		
2012	106.4	5.6		
2013	110.8	6.0	711.5	147,627
2014	122.3	6.2	805.8	147,425
2015	125.2	6.6	848.9	142,459
2016	122.4	6.9	883.8	140,253
2017	126.1	6.8	901.3	140,553
2018	132.3	7.7	897.6	142,460
2019	142.4	8.3	1,011.1	147,268
2020	140.5	7.1	1,060.0	150,269
2021	148.5	7.1	1,139.0	155,411
2022	152.7	6.9	1,022.0	159,253
2023	161.7	9.0	983.0	157,883
2024	179.8	10.5	1,045.0	156,626
2025	186.9	11.4	1,024.0	156,875

== Operations ==
Allianz has operations in over 70 countries and has around 150,000 employees. The parent company, Allianz SE, is headquartered in Munich. Allianz has more than 100 million customers worldwide and its services include property and casualty insurance, life and health insurance and asset management. In 2013, it was number 25 on the global Forbes 2000 list.

Countries served by Allianz as of May 2022

=== Australia ===
Allianz Australia Insurance Limited was founded 1914 as Manufacturers Mutual Insurance (MMI). Allianz acquired MMI in 1998. Allianz Australia operates throughout Australia and New Zealand and through its subsidiaries offers a range of insurance and risk management products and services. Subsidiaries of Allianz Australia include Club Marine, Allianz Life, Allianz Partners and Territory Insurance Office (TIO).

In 2012, Allianz Australia became the naming rights sponsor of the former Sydney Football Stadium. In 2022, the deal was renewed for a further six years and a newly rebuilt Allianz Stadium, designed by Cox Architecture, opened its doors in 2022. Allianz is also an ongoing partner of the Australian Olympic Team, Paralympics Team and Football Australia. Allianz Australia acquired Westpac Banking Corporation's general insurance arm in 2021. They entered an exclusive agreement to distribute general insurance products to the bank's customers for 20 years. In January 2025, it was announced that Allianz Australia would sell its subsidiary Hunter Premium Funding to Pemba Capital Partners. Later during that same year on 28 February 2025, Allianz Australia and AWP Australia were fined $16.8m for false and misleading statements by Commonwealth Director of Public Prosecutions after investigation and referral by the Australia Securities & Investments Commission (ASIC). On 12 June 2025, Allianz Australia received regulatory approval to begin its partnership with the Royal Automobile Association of South Australia Incorporated (RAA), including acquiring RAA's general insurance business and a 20-year exclusive distribution agreement for RAA's Home and Motor insurance lines.

=== Belgium ===
Belgium, previously AGF Belgium which has been re-branded to Allianz Belgium in November 2007. In 2012, Allianz Belgium (including Luxembourg) and Allianz Netherlands were integrated to become Allianz Benelux. In August 2020, they announced the selling of its closed classical life insurance retail insurance book with covering assets such as mortgages to Monument Re.

=== Bulgaria ===
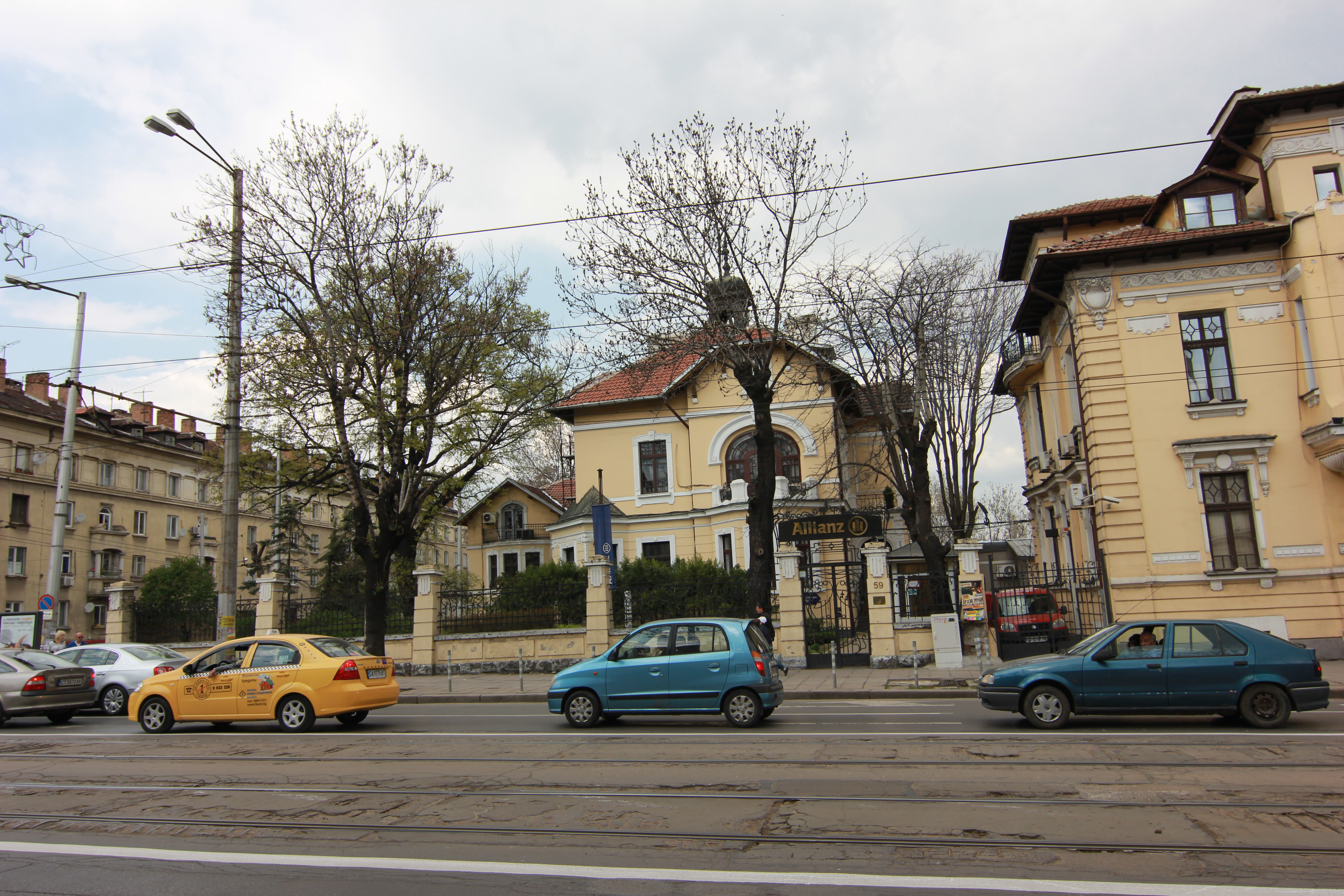
Allianz Bank Bulgaria headquarters in Sofia

Allianz Bank Bulgaria is a universal commercial bank having its headquarters in Sofia. It was established in 1991. On 13 October 2003 the bank received the name of its principal shareholder – Allianz Bulgaria Holding. Before that the bank was named 'Bulgaria Invest' Commercial Bank. Allianz Bank Bulgaria offers its products in more than hundred branches and offices all over the country, as well as through the broad agents' network of Allianz Bulgaria Holding. The bank possesses a full banking license for carrying out banking and financial transactions.

=== Canada ===
Allianz entered the Canadian market in the early 1990s through an acquisition of several North American insurers, namely the American Firemans Fund and the Canadian Surety. Upon the market exit the personal and commercial lines unit was sold off to the market leader ING Canada (Now Intact), and Allianz Canada continues operations in Cambridge, Ontario. Allianz Canada has also merged with TIC Travel Insurance in 2014 and has become one of the largest insurance companies in Canada as a result.

On 18 February 2025, the firm was identified as the lead insurer for the crash of Delta Connection Flight 4819 from Minneapolis which crashed at Toronto Pearson International Airport.

=== China ===
In January 2021, the China Banking and Insurance Regulatory Commission authorized the Allianz group to establish Allianz Insurance Asset Management, owned by Allianz China Iamc and based in Beijing. The next month, Allianz agreed with CITIC Trust the acquisition of the 49% minority stake of Allianz China Life Insurance Co, realizing the "China’s first wholly foreign-owned insurance asset management company".

The company announced on 13 January 2025 a collaboration between itself and Fudan University to support research into finance and insurance as well sponsoring Allianz Auditorium.

=== Colombia ===
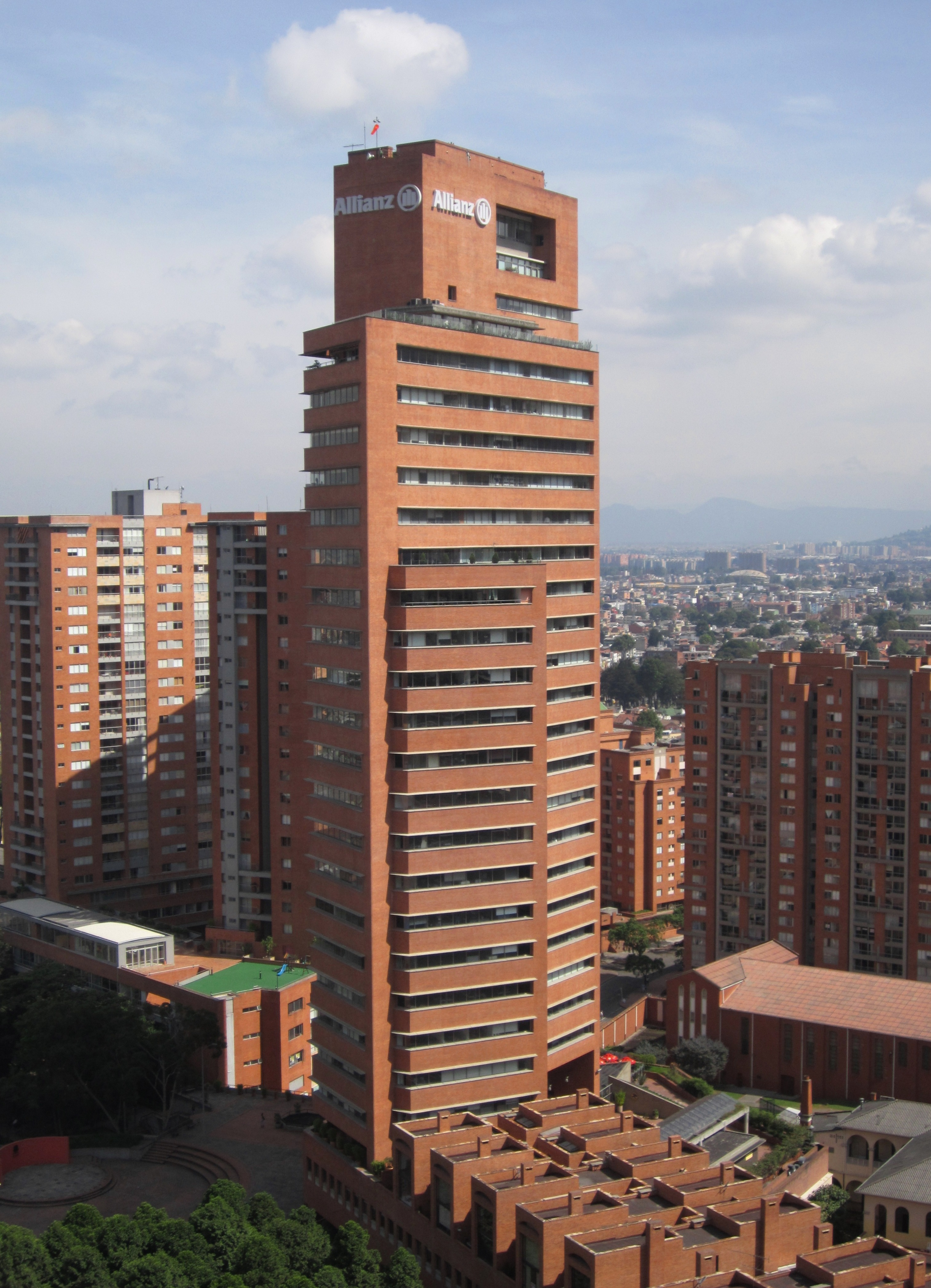
Allianz Colombia headquarters in Bogotá

In 1999, Allianz acquired 60% of the shares of Colombian insurer Colseguros. Three years later, in 2002, it increased its shareholding, becoming the sole owner of the company in Colombia. After almost 10 years in 2012 and with an evolutionary change of brand Colseguros was retired as an official name and the entire operation in Colombia was consolidated under the name of Allianz.

=== Finland ===
In 2017, Allianz alongside Macquarie Group and Valtion Eläkerahasto acquired Elenia taking ownership of Finland's second largest power distribution system operator and ninth largest district heating network.

=== Germany ===
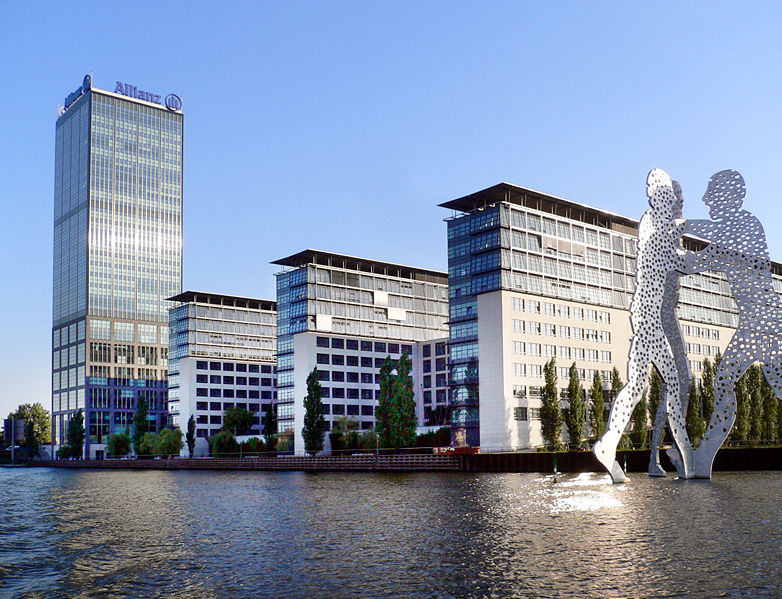
The Allianz complex in Alt-Treptow, Berlin

Allianz offers a wide range of general, life and health insurance products in Germany through its Allianz Deutschland AG subsidiary. It is the market leader in both the general and life insurance markets. Allianz products are distributed principally through a network of full-time tied agents. Since September 2010 Allianz products have also been sold through Commerzbank branches.

On 19 March 2025, it was announced as part of a consortium the purchase of Viridum Group in a €3.5bn deal with BlackRock and T&D Holdings which is a life insurer consolidation platform specialising in the run-off from Cinven with Generali Financial Holdings and Hanover Re remaining as investors.

=== Greece ===
In Greece Allianz began to work on 2 December 1985. Then was established the first Company's Office in Ampelokipoi, Athens. Now Allianz has almost 500 Offices in Greece. In February 2022, it was announced Allianz had acquired 72% of European Reliance for €207 million.

=== India ===
In India Allianz primarily operates through Bajaj Allianz Life Insurance Company & Bajaj General Insurance Company Limited, a joint venture between Allianz and Bajaj Finserv Limited. Bajaj Allianz has around 1,200 branches across India and offers services including unit-linked, traditional, health, child and pension policies.

On 19 March 2025, it was agreed that Allianz would exit the joint venture for approximately €2.6bn selling its 26% stake to Bajaj Finserv.

=== Indonesia ===
Allianz started its operations in Indonesia with a representative office in 1981. In 1989, Allianz established PT Asuransi Allianz Utama Indonesia, a general insurance company. Furthermore, Allianz entered the Indonesian life insurance market by opening PT Asuransi Allianz Life Indonesia in 1996.

=== Ireland ===
Allianz plc in Ireland employs over 1,700 people. Established in 1902, Allianz plc is active in both the Republic of Ireland and Northern Ireland, providing car, home, pet, boat, and travel products, as well as SME (small to medium enterprise) products including van, business, and schools insurance. Today, Allianz in Ireland insures over 900,000 customers across the country through its portfolio of personal and commercial insurance products. In 1999, through their acquisition of AGF, Allianz SE acquired AGF Irish Life Holdings plc in Ireland, which at the time owned Insurance Corporation of Ireland and Church and General Insurance. Following their purchase, and despite a minority shareholding by Irish Life, both companies changed their names to Allianz plc, trading simply as Allianz. In 2017, Allianz plc became a wholly owned entity of Allianz SE.

=== Israel ===
On 9 April 2019, Allianz started cooperation with Cynet, a cybersecurity company in the field of threat detection and response to address security threats and improve its resilience.

=== Italy ===
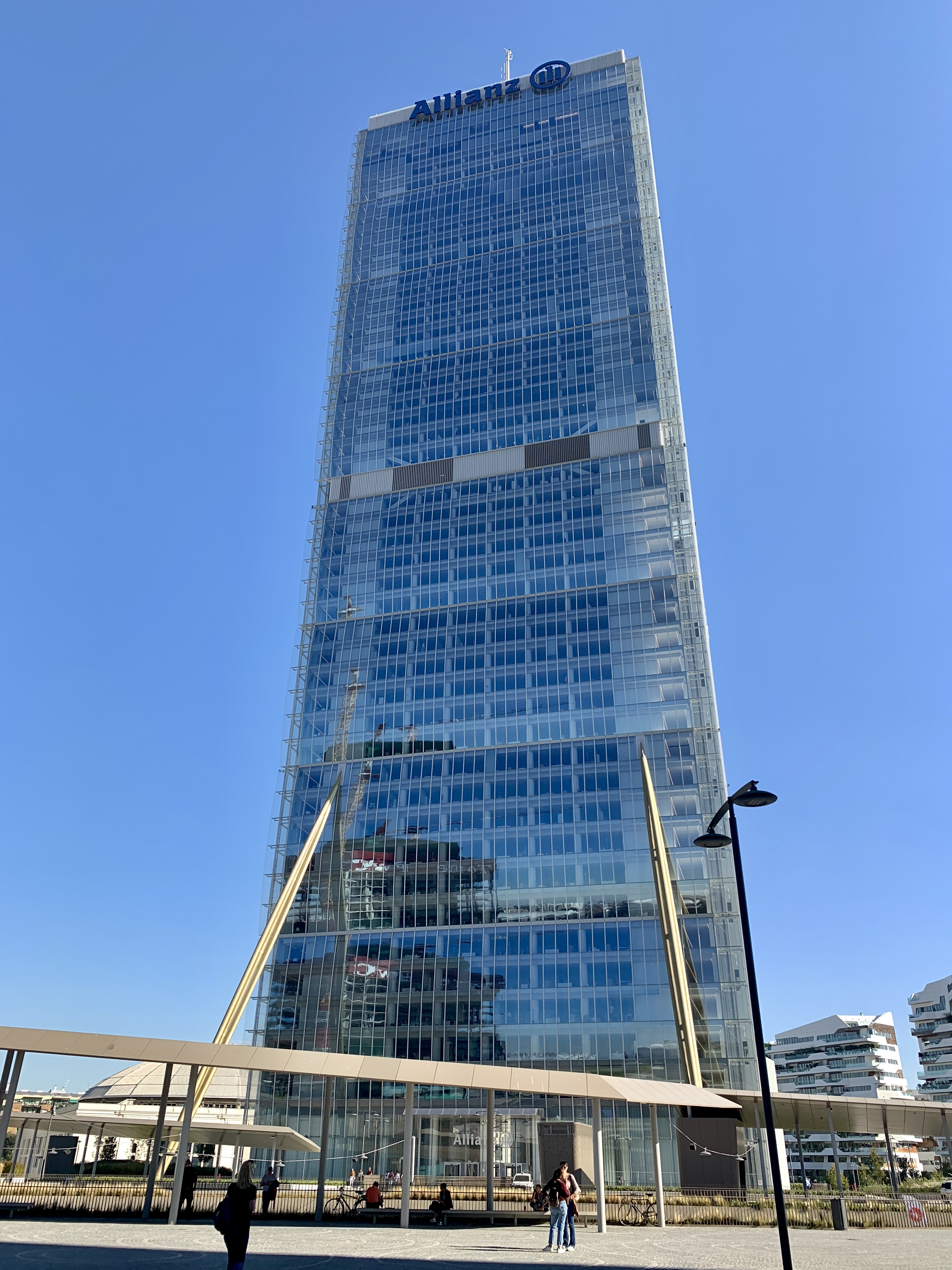
The Allianz Tower in Milan

The Allianz Group in Italy is headed by composite insurance company Allianz SpA and it ranks second in terms of premiums written and fifth in terms of assets under management as well as fourth for financial advisors.

The Italian parent company, Allianz SpA, resulted from the integration, in October 2007, of three former insurance companies: RAS ("Riunione Adriatica di Sicurtà", Assurance Adriatic Reunion), established in Trieste in 1838 and based in Milan (part of the Allianz Group since 1987), Lloyd Adriatico, established in 1836 and based in Trieste (part of the Allianz Group since 1995) and Allianz Subalpina, established in 1928 and based in Turin (formerly a subsidiary of RAS).

=== Kenya ===
On 25 November 2016, Allianz opened a new office in Kenya.

=== Luxembourg ===
Allianz's subsidiary Allianz Global Partners was fined €283,000 for breaching the country's Anti-Laundering laws. The fine was issued in 2022, Allianz appealed but was upheld by the Administrative Court in February.

=== Mexico ===
Allianz Mexico started operations in 1987.

=== Philippines ===
In 1998, Allianz AG began its operation in the Philippines under the joint venture partnership with Pioneer Life Incorporated which lasted for five years.

Allianz returned its operations in the country in 2016 as a subsidiary group with an exclusive distribution partnership with the Philippine National Bank. They are currently operated under the name of Allianz - PNB Life Insurance Incorporated.

=== Portugal ===
In 2018 Allianz, via Allianz Capital Partners, acquired the largest subsidy-free solar project in Portugal.

=== Russia ===
Allianz started operations in Russia in 1990, with the following acquisition of one of the largest Russian insurance companies ROSNO. In 2018, after the global acquisition of Euler Hermes, Allianz presence in Russian Federation was extended by its local credit insurance branch – Euler Hermes Russia. In June 2022, in the wake of the Russian invasion of Ukraine Allianz sold a 50.1% stake in its Russian operations to Russian company Interholding LLC, while retaining a 49.9% stake there. This was widely criticized by international activists.

=== Slovakia ===
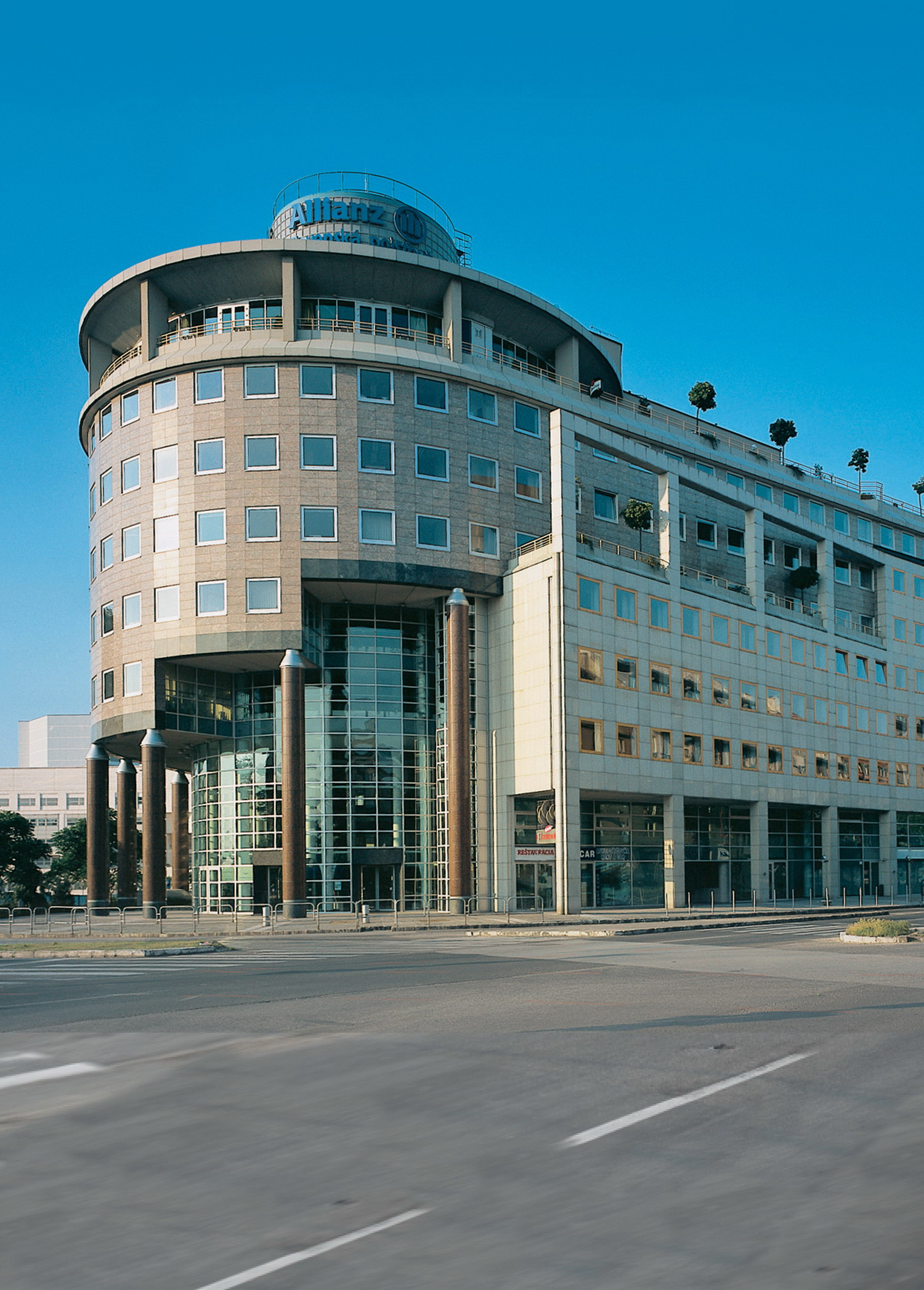
The headquarters of Allianz – Slovenská poisťovňa in Bratislava

Allianz started its life and Property & Casualty (P&C) operation in Slovakia in 1993. In 2001 Allianz AG bought a majority stake in the state-owned Slovenská poisťovňa (SP, Slovak Insurance Company). Upon the purchase SP held a market share of well over 50%. Upon the purchase the local Allianz operation was merged with SP creating a new company Allianz – Slovenská poisťovňa.

=== Sri Lanka ===
On 26 March 2025, it was announced that Allianz's life operations in Sri Lanka would be acquired by Softlogic Life Insurance.

=== Turkey ===
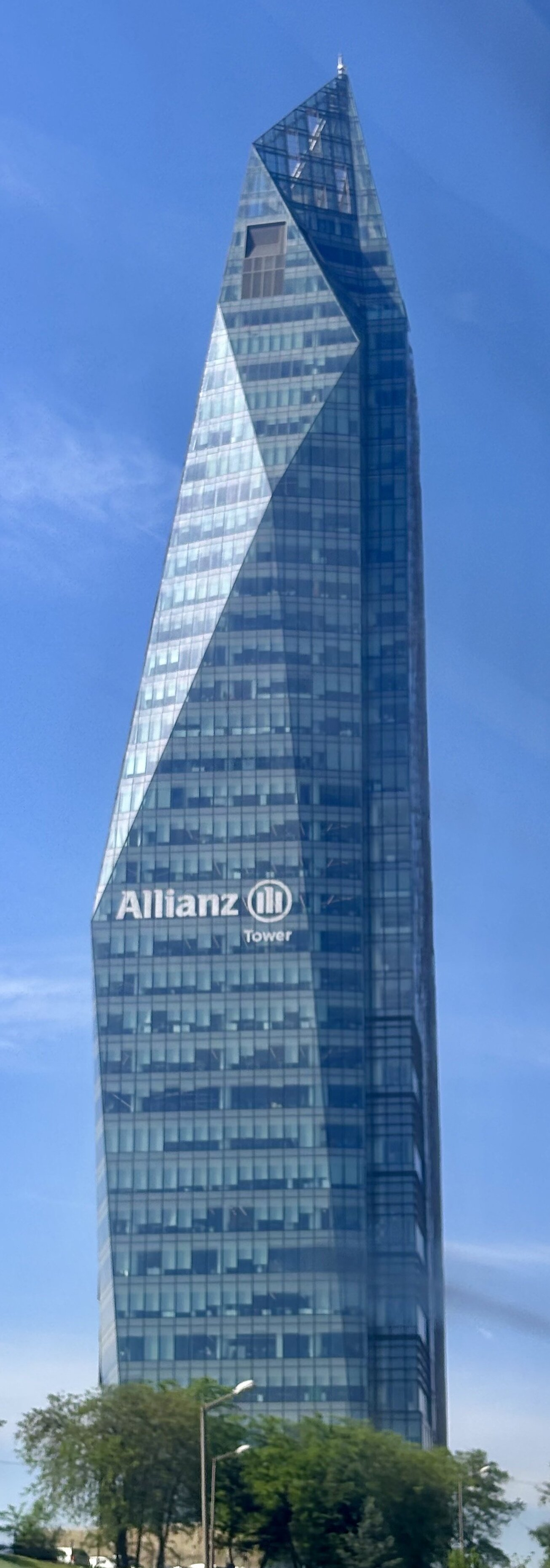
Allianz Tower in Ataşehir, Istanbul

The affiliated services of Allianz in Turkey (through Şark Sigorta) started in 1923, while the direct presence of Allianz in the country began in 1988, when the company partnered with Şark Sigorta together with the Tokio Marine insurance company of Japan. In 1991, Şark Hayat Sigorta was founded. In 1998, the two companies changed their names as Koç Allianz Sigorta and Koç Allianz Hayat Sigorta, respectively, and started operating under Allianz Sigorta and Allianz Hayat ve Emeklilik business titles, upon the takeover of Koç Holding's shares by Allianz in 2008. Allianz Group made a new investment in Turkey in 2013 by acquiring Yapı Kredi Sigorta and Yapı Kredi Emeklilik. In October 2013, Yapı Kredi Emeklilik was renamed as Allianz Yaşam ve Emeklilik. In 2014, Allianz Sigorta and Yapı Kredi Sigorta were merged and the insurance operations were combined under the roof of Allianz Sigorta.

In 2015, Allianz Turkey moved its head office to Allianz Tower in the Ataşehir district of Istanbul. Ataşehir is home to the Istanbul Financial Center (IFC), opened in 2023. The Allianz Campus operation center will be opened in İzmir.

=== United Kingdom ===
Allianz acquired British insurance company Cornhill Insurance plc in 1986, subsequently renamed Allianz Cornhill Insurance plc. This then simply became Allianz Insurance plc in April 2007. Allianz purchased Premierline in 2003, previously owning a 20% stake in the business and then later purchasing the remaining 80% stake in business. Allianz Insurance plc owns Petplan UK, the UK pet insurance provider. It also owns the high-net-worth insurance broker Home and Legacy, which it purchased in 2006. Their IT captive unit in India, ACIS is located at Technopark, Trivandrum, in Kerala. Allianz previously owned Kleinwort Benson, which it inherited when it acquired Dresdner Bank. The investment bank has subsequently been merged with the corporate bank of Dresdner Bank and rebranded as Dresdner Kleinwort.

In 2017, Allianz acquired a stake in the general insurance division of Liverpool Victoria for a deal worth up to £1bn. The deal had its personal lines go to Liverpool Victoria, creating a joint venture between the two firms, with the latter's commercial lines going to Allianz.

In 2019, Allianz paid a total of £800 million to purchase the remaining 51% stake in the general insurance division of Liverpool Victoria ending the joint venture between the firms as well as taking over the whole of the general insurance arm of Legal & General.

The deal has concluded with both general insurance firms now part of the Allianz group of companies starting on 1 January 2020 with the L&G division being officially renamed Fairmead Insurance. Allianz continues to operate Liverpool Victoria General Insurance under a brand license agreement, which was successfully renewed through a new multi-year partnership announced in April 2026.

=== United States ===
Allianz has a presence within the United States, including Allianz Life Insurance Company of North America and Allianz Global Corporate & Specialty (which incorporates Fireman's Fund). Allianz Life Insurance Company of North America, based in suburban Minneapolis, has been ranked among the 100 best companies to work for by Fortune. Allianz's investment arm includes two asset managers, PIMCO and Allianz Global Investors, also referred to as AllianzGI or AGI.

== Senior management ==
The Allianz board of directors is chaired by Oliver Bäte and includes Sirma Boshnakova, Claire-Marie Coste-Lepoutre, Dr. Barbara Karuth-Zelle, Dr. Klaus-Peter Röhler, Dr. Günther Thallinger, Christopher Townsend, Renate Wagner and Dr. Andreas G. Wimmer.

=== List of CEOs ===
Years	Name
1890–1904	Carl von Thieme
1894–1921	Paul von der Nahmer
1921–1933	Kurt Schmitt
1933–1948	Hans Hess
1948–1961	Hans Goudefroy
1962–1971	Alfred Haase
1971–1991	Wolfgang Schieren
1991–2003	Henning Schulte-Noelle
2003–2015	Michael Diekmann
2015–today	Oliver Bäte

== Sponsorships ==
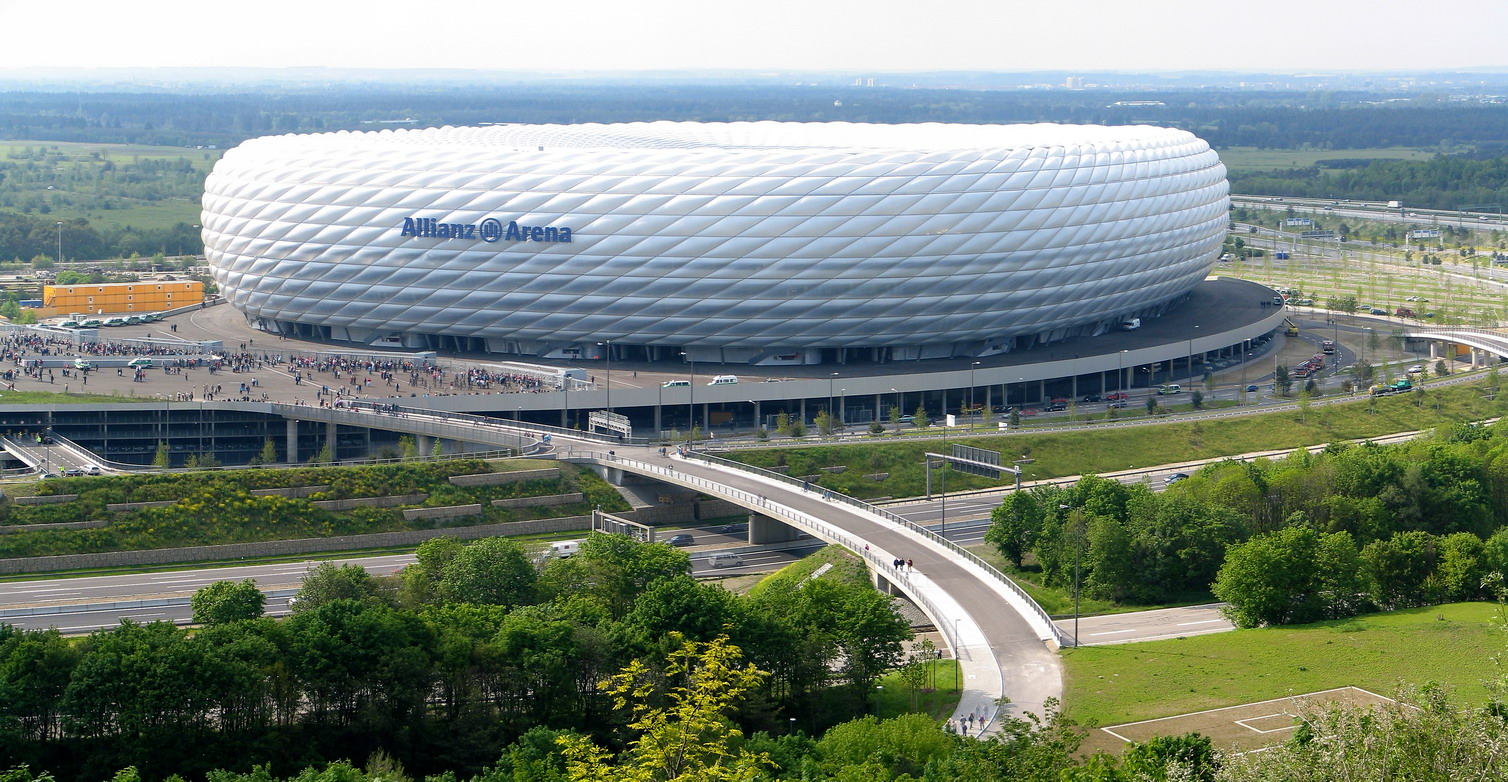
The Allianz Arena in Munich, Germany

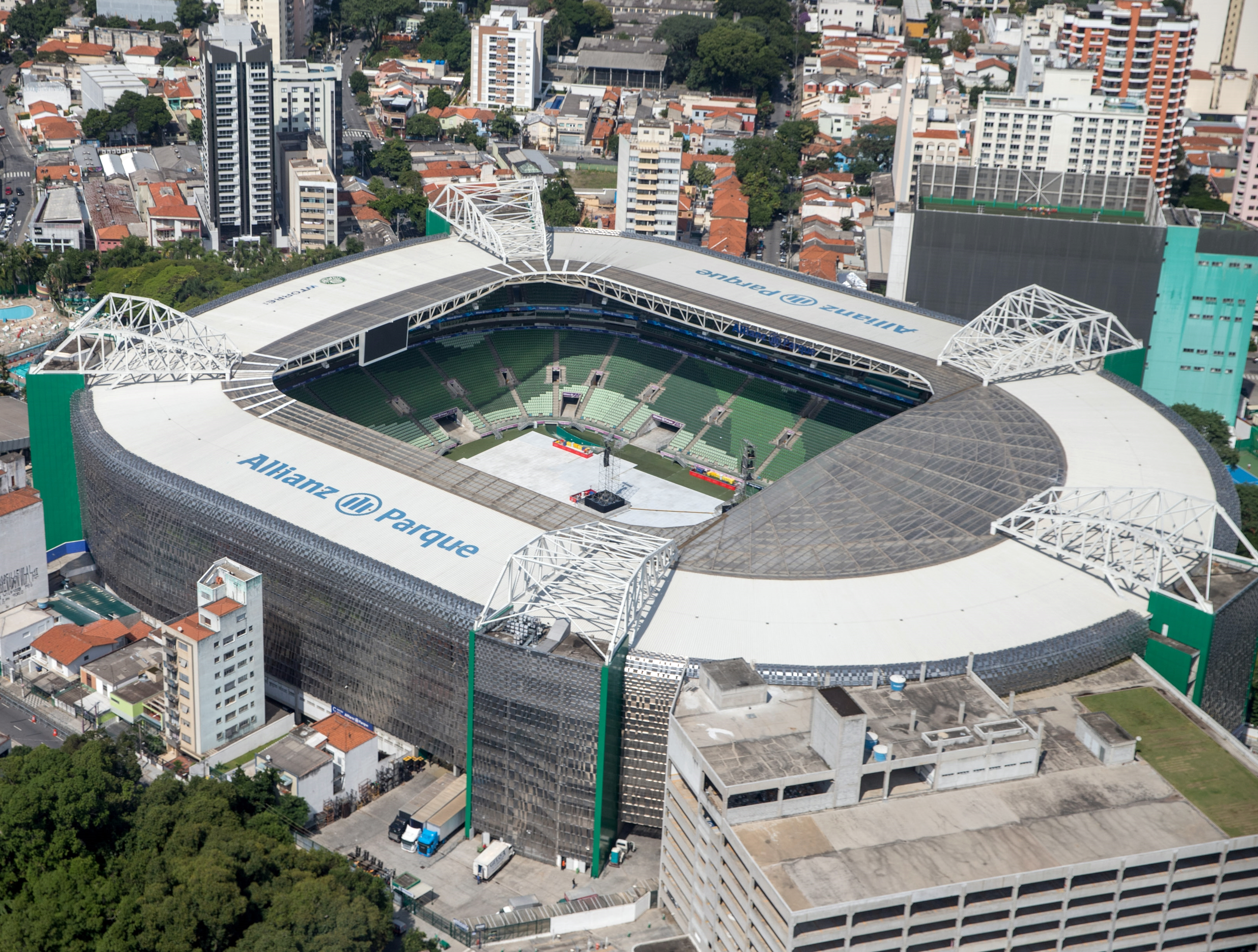
Allianz Parque in São Paulo, Brazil

Allianz holds naming rights to the Allianz Arena, a football stadium in north Munich. The professional Munich football club Bayern Munich have played their home games at Allianz Arena since the start of the 2005–06 season. TSV 1860 München played their home games at Allianz Arena until the end of the 2016–17 season. Other stadiums associated with Allianz include the Allianz Parque football stadium in São Paulo, Brazil, Twickenham Stadium in London (the main rugby union stadium in England), the Allianz Riviera football stadium in Nice, France, the Allianz Stadium football stadium in Turin, Italy, the Allianz Stadion football stadium in Vienna, Austria and Allianz Field soccer stadium (for Minnesota United in Major League Soccer) in St. Paul, Minnesota, United States.

Allianz had been in negotiations with the New York Jets and the Giants to buy naming rights to the New Meadowlands Stadium (now known as MetLife Stadium) in East Rutherford, New Jersey, but those talks ended in September 2008, due to opposition from Jewish groups and Holocaust survivors.

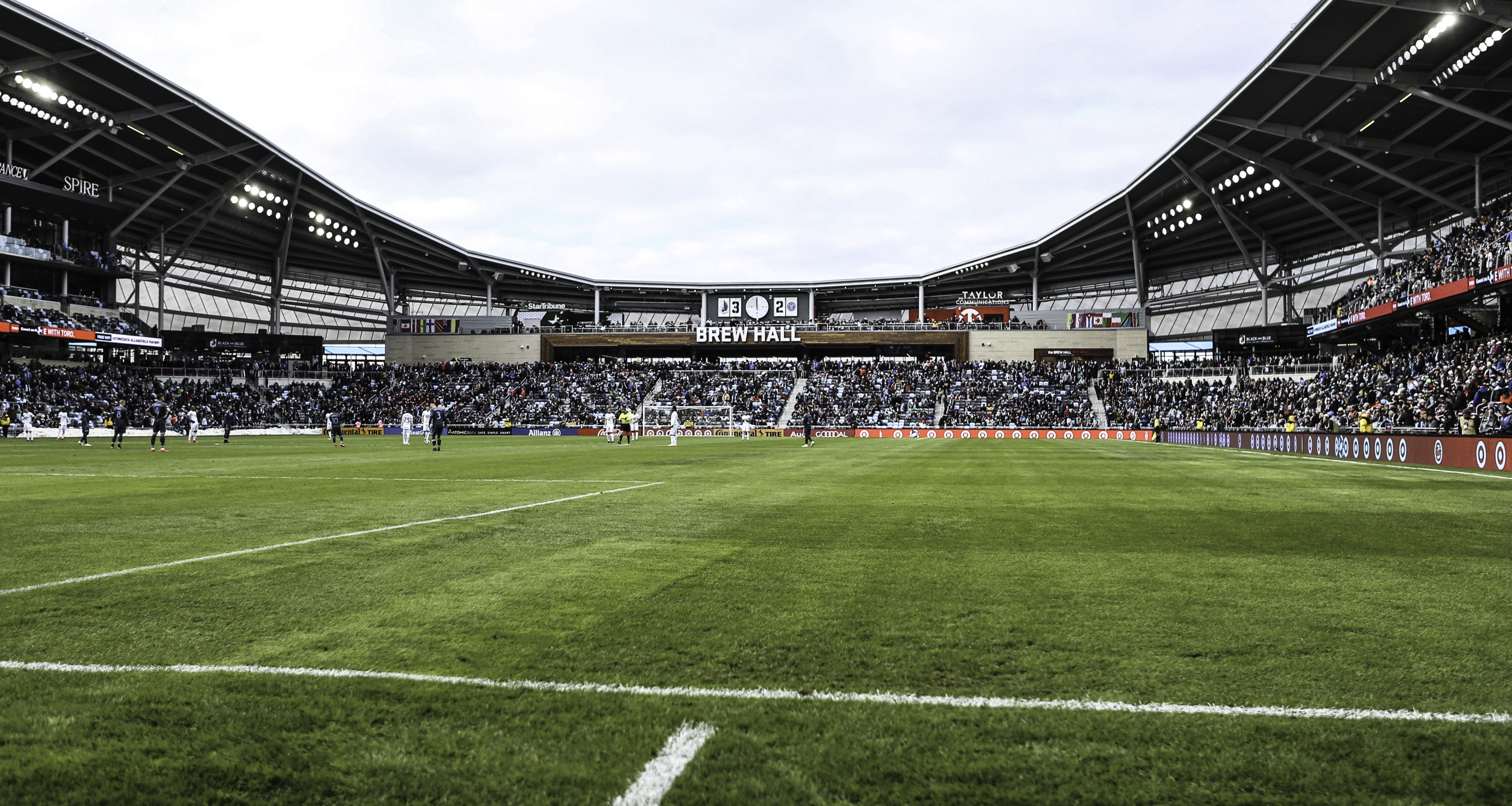
Allianz Field in Saint Paul, Minnesota

Allianz owned the Polish football team Górnik Zabrze but sold its shares in the club in April 2011. Allianz has been involved in Formula One since 2000, firstly as a sponsor of the AT&T Williams F1 Team, and since 2011 as a sponsor of the Mercedes GP Petronas team. In 2009 Allianz signed an agreement to become the Global Partner of the St. Andrews Links Trust. In early 2012, Allianz entered an agreement with the Sydney Cricket & Sports Ground Trust which oversaw the Sydney Football Stadium being renamed Allianz Stadium. 2012 also saw Allianz partner up with Saracens to be their main shirt sponsor as well as securing an £8 million deal for naming rights to their new Copthall Stadium home which became Allianz Park. This deal was terminated on 25 October 2020 following the conclusion of the 2019–20 season.

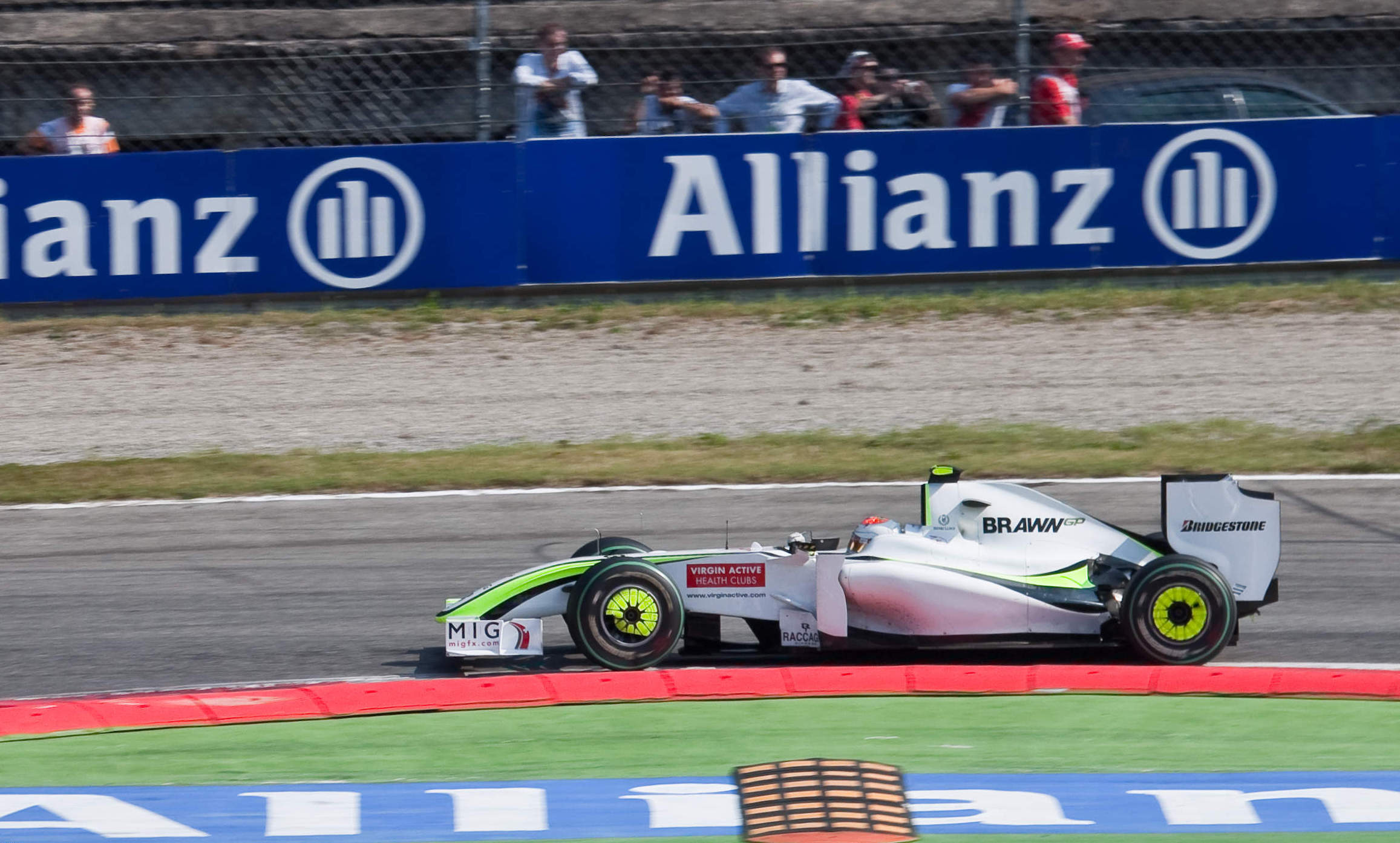
Allianz has been a key sponsor of Formula One since 2000.

The company has also been the sponsor of other sports, including the Women's British Open (golf), Allianz Open de Lyon (golf), Allianz Golf Open du Grand Toulouse (golf), Swiss Open (tennis), Allianz Cup (tennis), Boca Raton Championship (golf), La Liga (football), Premier League (football), World Aquatics Swimming World Cup (swimming), and World Athletics Championships (athletics) events.

In Ireland, the national Gaelic football league is officially named the Allianz National Football League, and the national hurling league is officially named the Allianz Hurling League.

In Italy, the company is the title sponsor of the main basketball club of Trieste, officially known Allianz Pallacanestro Trieste.

Allianz is also the official worldwide insurance partner of the 2022 Winter Olympics and Paralympics, the 2024 Summer Olympics and Paralympics, the 2026 Winter Olympics and Paralympics, and the 2028 Summer Olympics and Paralympics.

== Nazi-era activities and litigation ==
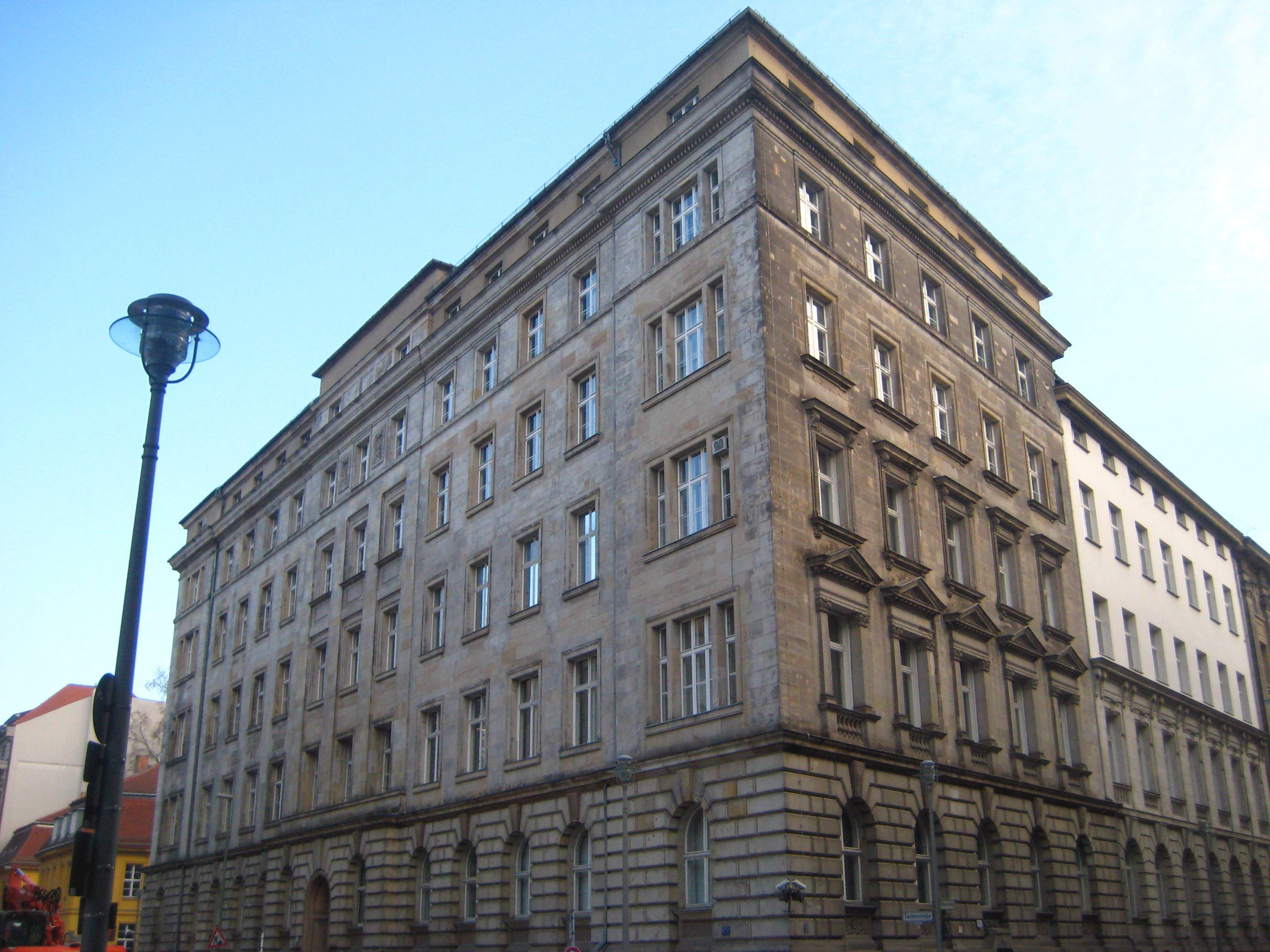
The former Allianz head office in Berlin

In 1993, Henning Schulte-Noelle commissioned an archive for corporate history, becoming the first Allianz CEO to address the company's activities during Nazi Germany. In 1997, Schulte-Noelle asked Gerald Feldman, a University of California-Berkeley history professor, to undertake a larger research project on Allianz's past involvement with Nazi Germany. After research began, Jewish World War II survivors and their descendants took Allianz and other European insurance companies to court, accusing them of unpaid insurance policies. Allianz and four other insurers supported the creation of the International Commission on Holocaust Era Insurance Claims (ICHEIC).

Furthermore, Allianz became a founding member of the German foundation Remembrance, Responsibility and Future. Feldman published the comprehensive results of his research in September 2001. Based on these results Allianz established an exhibition in the Archive for Corporate History and on the Internet. The research concluded that Allianz, as an organization and through its corporate officers, voluntarily partnered with the Nazi regime and Nazi Germany, starting as early as the early 1930s and continuing all the way through to the collapse of Nazi Germany.

Feldman summarized his findings stating: "It was just one more piece of business in the Third Reich, but it demonstrated that such pieces on any large scale made contact at some point with all that is represented by the name 'Auschwitz' – from slave labor to extermination – virtually inescapable."

Allianz had been a major supporter of the NSDAP, financially contributed to their growth before 1933, and the Director of Allianz was not only an early party member, but he became a cabinet minister in Hitler's first cabinet. Kurt Schmitt was Reich Economy Minister from 1933 to 1934, and he was deeply anti-Semitic. He had been on the Allianz board of directors from 1921 to 1933. During the war, Allianz provided coverage throughout the Reich until 1945.

Major General Gustav Lombard, the former commander of the Waffen-SS’ 8th SS Cavalry Division Florian Geyer, worked for Allianz in Munich after the war's end.

== Controversies ==
=== Israeli ties during the Gaza genocide ===
Allianz subsidiary PIMCO has purchased almost $1 billion in Israeli government bonds since 2023. Human rights groups and legal experts have warned that underwriting or investing in these bonds may constitute complicity in potential war crimes, crimes against humanity, or genocide under international law.

In June 2025, the UN warned that Allianz was complicit in genocide, according to international law.

== See also ==
- Allianz Trade
- International Association for the Study of Insurance Economics
