= Michael Diekmann =

Business person

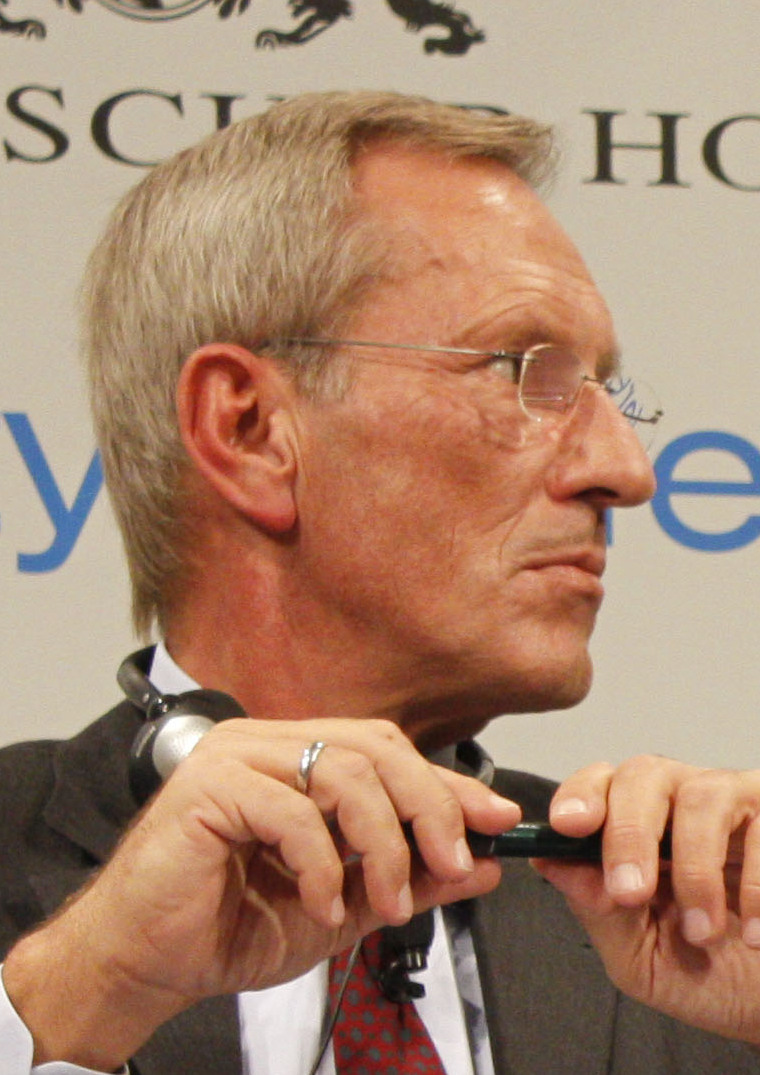
- Michael Diekmann, 2012
- Born: Michael Diekmann; December 23, 1954 (age 71); Bielefeld, West Germany (now Germany)
- Occupation: Former CEO of Allianz

Michael Diekmann (born December 23, 1954) is a German manager who was the CEO of Allianz from 2003 to 2015.

== Early life and education ==
Diekmann knew early that the family construction business would go to his twin brother, who was more interested in engineering. Instead, he earned his degree from Goettingen University, where he studied law and philosophy.

== Career ==
Diekmann began his career with Allianz in 1988 after becoming frustrated with his own business, a publishing house that focused on travel guides. During his career, he later worked in Australia and the United States, where he successfully revamped the Fireman's Fund Insurance Company, the Allianz subsidiary there. In 1996, he moved to Singapore to run Allianz's Asia-Pacific business front.

As CEO, Diekmann steered Allianz through a difficult period at the start of the century, moving it from a low point in profitability to a bumper year in 2013 with an operating profit of €10.1 billion. Under his leadership, the insurer also converted its legal form, then Aktiengesellschaft, or German joint-stock company, to Societas Europaea (SE) in 2006. By 2014, Allianz had grown to become the world’s second-biggest investor after BlackRock. That same year, Diekmann weathered a hailstorm of criticism about the sagging performance at the firm’s asset manager, Pimco.

Diekmann's total compensation from 2010 was around one hundred and five million Euros.

In late 2014, it was announced that Diekmann, would step down the following year after he turned 60, which is traditionally the age limit for board members at Allianz. At the time, investors widely expected him to stay in his role for a further one to two years.

== Other activities ==
=== Corporate boards ===
- FC Bayern Munich, member of the Supervisory Board (since 2025)
- Google Cloud Platform, member of the European Advisory Board (since 2022)
- Temasek Holdings, member of the European Advisory Panel (since 2016)
- Linklaters, member of the International Advisory Group (since 2016)
- Fresenius, deputy chairman of the Supervisory Board (since 2015)
- Siemens, member of the Supervisory Board (2008–2023)
- BASF, member of the Supervisory Board (2003–2019)
- Linde, deputy chairman of the Supervisory Board (2003–2017)
- Lufthansa, member of the Supervisory Board (2003–2008)

=== Non-profit organizations ===
- Allianz Umweltstiftung, deputy chairman of the Board of Trustees (-2015)
- European School of Management and Technology (ESMT), chairman of the Board of Trustees (2007-2015)
- Siemens Stiftung, member of the Board of Trustees
- International Business Leaders Advisory Council for the Mayor of Shanghai (IBLAC), member
- Monetary Authority of Singapore, member of the Advisory Board
- Munich Security Conference, member of the Advisory Council (2008-2015)
- Pan-European Insurance Forum (PEIF), member (2003-2015)
- Geneva Association, vice chairman (2003-2015)
