= Fireman's Fund Insurance Company =

American insurer (1863–2015)

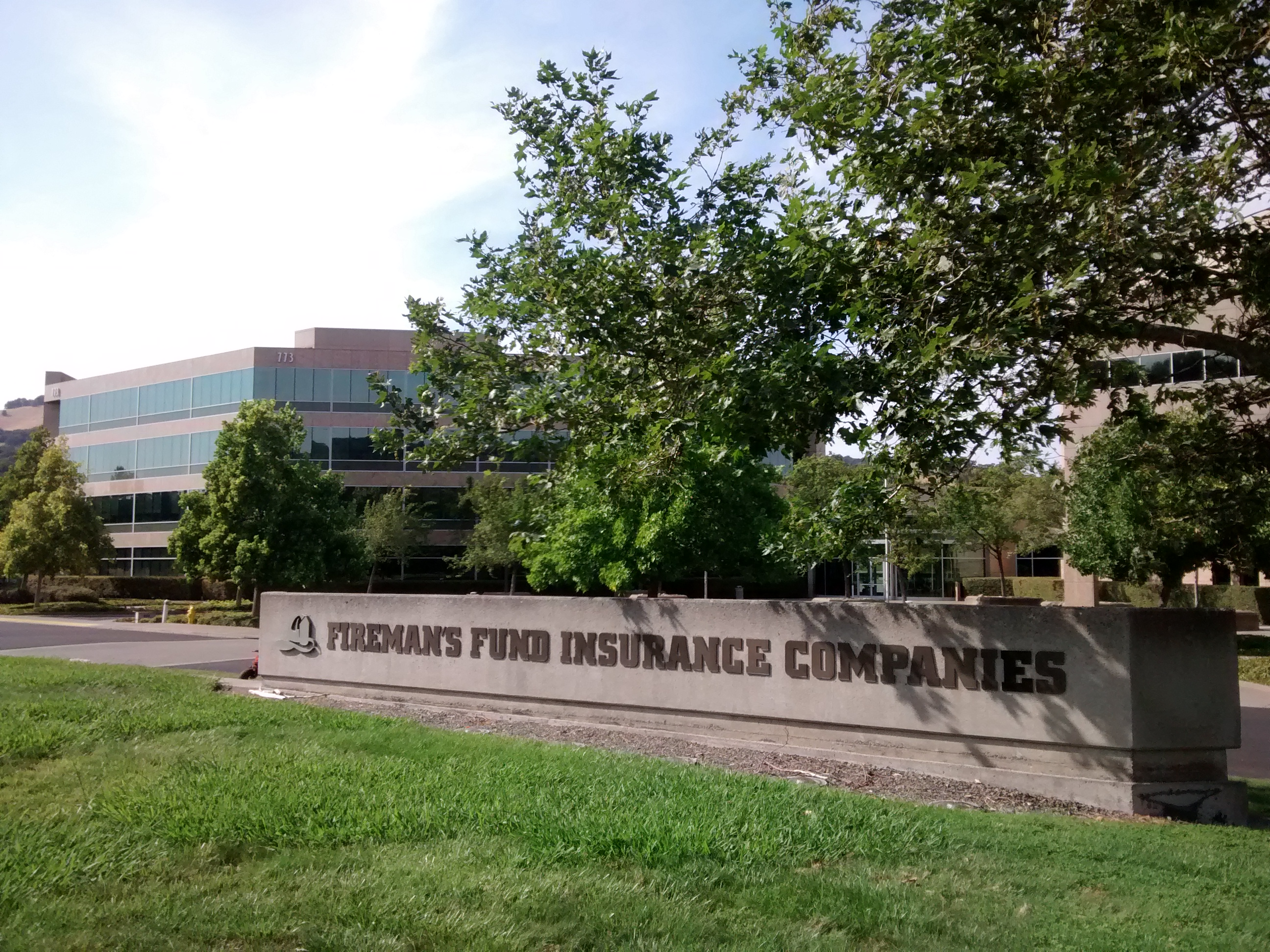
- Type: Subsidiary
- Industry: Insurance
- Founded: 1863; 163 years ago
- Founder: William Holdredge
- Defunct: 2015; 11 years ago
- Fate: Merged with Allianz Global Corporate & Speciality in 2015
- Headquarters: Novato, California, United States
- Area served: United States
- Products: Insurance
- Services: home owners, business office policies, workers compensation, excess liability, auto, farm and ranch coverage
- Parent: Allianz

Fireman's Fund Insurance Company was an American insurance company based in Novato, California which provided personal, commercial property, and casualty insurance products in the United States. The company was a principal U.S. subsidiary of Allianz, a global financial services company.

Fireman's Fund offered a ranging portfolio of coverage including personal auto, homeowners, excess and collections insurance for high-net-worth clients. Commercial insurance products included entertainment, business office policies, workers' compensation, general, professional, excess liability, auto, farm, and ranch coverage.

== History ==
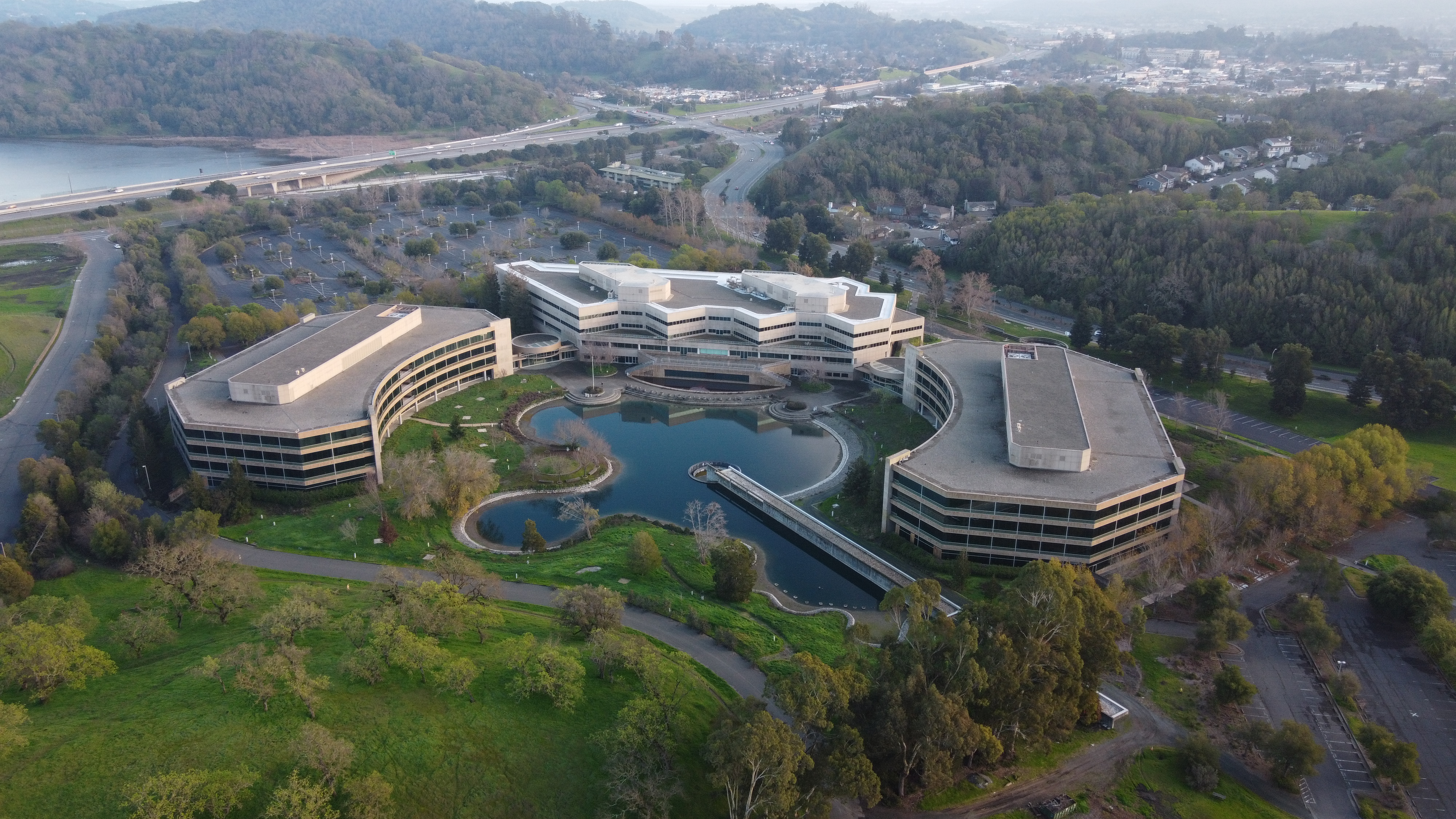
The Fireman's Fund building in Novato

Fireman's Fund Insurance Company was founded in 1863 in San Francisco. Its name reflected its founding mission in which 10 percent of profits were paid to the widows and orphans of fallen firefighters.

The company had continued a similar social mission through its Heritage Program, in which it provided millions of dollars each year in grants for equipment, training, and educational programs to local fire departments across the United States.

Since its inception, Fireman's Fund had insured some of America's landmarks and inventions, including the Golden Gate Bridge and the Spirit of St. Louis.

Fireman's Fund was previously the largest insurer and underwriter in the Hollywood film industry, insuring motion picture productions since the silent film era. The company also underwrote reality television shows, concerts, and special events. Its largest film insurance payout was a $15 million claim after star John Candy died during production of the 1994 film Wagons East.

In September 2014, it was announced in the German press that Allianz Global Corporate & Specialty (AGCS), Allianz Group's specialty corporate insurer, would fully integrate Fireman's Fund's commercial property/casualty insurance business beginning on January 1, 2015. In a move following the announcement of the integration, ACE agreed to acquire Fireman's Fund Insurance Co.’s personal lines business for a total of $365 million. The deal closed in the second quarter of 2015.

== Timeline ==
1863 — Ship captain William Holdredge founded Fireman's Fund Insurance Company in San Francisco. Its first policy was one-half interest in 1,000 kegs of Boston syrup. The premium was $12 cash in advance.

1871 — The company paid all of its claims from the Great Chicago Fire – about a half million dollars' worth – within 60 days, nearly wiping out all of the company's capital.

1905 — The company had roughly 6,000 independent agents.

1906 — Fireman's Fund was the first company to provide nationwide auto insurance.

1906 — San Francisco earthquake destroyed Fireman's Fund's headquarters and all records, but it was able to pay all policyholder claims with a combination of cash and stock. Claims were taken “on their word” as all insurance documents were destroyed.

1920s — Insured the first movies with sound. Since then, the company has insured movies ranging from Top Gun to The Lord of the Rings trilogy and is currently the largest insurer of Hollywood films.

1927 — Insured Charles Lindbergh's Spirit of St. Louis.

1936 — The company grew to 1,500 employees and about 10,000 independent agents.

1953 — Moved its headquarters to a modern facility in San Francisco's Laurel Heights neighborhood.

1957 — Premium income topped $300 million.

1968 — American Express acquired Fireman's Fund.

Early 1980s — Outgrew its space in San Francisco and moved the headquarters north to Novato, California

1984 — Insured the ABC telecast of the 1984 Olympics.

1985 — Fireman's Fund was sold off by American Express and became an independent company.

1991 — Allianz acquired Fireman's Fund.

2001 — All of the company's 109 New York employees located in the south tower of the World Trade Center survived the September 11 attacks.

2004 — Fireman's Fund launched the Heritage Program, a recommitment of its founding philanthropic mission to support the fire service. Grants are given to local fire departments to help purchase new equipment, tools and training.

2006 — Created the first green insurance products in the United States.

2014 — Announced that Allianz Global Corporate & Specialty would fully integrate the commercial Property/Casualty business of Fireman's Fund beginning in January 2015.

2015 — ACE Limited, a Swiss insurance company, agrees to purchase Fireman's Fund personal lines business for $365 million.

2016 — ACE combined with and adopted the Chubb name in January 2016 after the acquisition was completed.

2019 — Fireman's Fund moves out of its Novato complex, leaving for a smaller complex in Petaluma. The building lies abandoned, but proposals have been made to turn the complex into housing.

2020 — Fireman's Fund Insurance Company was sued by Lionsgate for $1.62 million following the death of a cast member and a fire that destroyed a Hungarian studio during the shooting of its 2018 film Robin Hood.

2025- Bay West Development intends to initiate demolition of the former Fireman’s Fund office campus on or shortly after September 8, 2025. The expected start of demolition is tentative and subject to change. The demolition process will include removing the existing office buildings, parking lots, on-site utilities, man-made pond, landscaping, and other constructed improvements within the area bounded by East Campus Drive, West Campus Drive, and San Marin Drive.

== Business model ==
Fireman's Fund worked with independent agents and brokers and was composed of two (2) primary business units: commercial insurance (includes agribusiness) and personal insurance.

Commercial Insurance offered businesses and organizations risk management by providing admitted and non-admitted solutions, customized products for a variety of industries and program business for small to mid-sized affinity programs.

Personal insurance for high-net-worth and affluent customers included home, auto, valuables, excess liability, art, wine, and jewelry collections, yacht, and watercraft.

Fireman's Fund had provided Farm and Ranch insurance for American farmers since 1876 – owner occupied family farms and larger scale agricultural operations for ranchers, farmers, and dairy owners.

Fireman's Fund was the first insurer in the United States to offer green insurance coverage for both personal and commercial lines, starting in 2006.

== U.S.-based sister organizations ==
- Allianz Global Investors
- Pacific Investment Management Company
- Allianz Life Insurance Company of North America
- Allianz Global Assistance

== See also ==
- Paysage Bords de Seine
