= Jacqueline Hunt =

South African businessperson (b. 1968)

- Born: April 27, 1968 (age 58); Johannesburg, South Africa
- Education: University of Witwatersrand
- Occupations: Board of Management, Allianz
- Children: 2

Jacqueline ("Jackie") Hunt (born April 27, 1968, in Johannesburg) is a British financial services manager. Since 2016 she has been on the management board of Allianz SE, overseeing the group's asset management and US life insurance divisions. She is responsible for managing assets worth more than $2 trillion, leading Bloomberg News to describe her as “one of the most important people in global finance”.

== Early life ==
Hunt, who holds British and New Zealand citizenship, was born in Johannesburg. Her father died when she was very young, and she has described her mother, who brought her up alone, as an inspiring influence.

== Education ==
At school she was a gifted pupil, with particular passions for geology and English literature. Her higher education, at the University of the Witwatersrand, was funded by a bursary from a mining company, for which she worked during vacations; but she was put off the idea of a career in mining by the fact that, as a woman, she would not be allowed into any ore mines but would be restricted to laboratory work. After graduating in commerce and accountancy, she bought herself out of her obligations to work for the company that had sponsored her.

== Career ==
Hunt began her career at Deloitte & Touche, qualified as a chartered accountant at the South African Institute of Chartered Accountants, and was sent to New Zealand, where she began to get involved in corporate finance before moving to PricewaterhouseCoopers as senior audit manager. Here she gained experience in financial services, including spells in New York and Zürich, eventually becoming director, global capital markets. She then joined Royal & Sun Alliance, in 1999, as deputy director, capital management.

In 2003 she joined Aviva, the UK life assurance group, where she spent four years, becoming group finance director of Hibernian Group, its Ireland business, in 2005.

In 2007 she returned to the UK to become finance director at Norwich Union, Aviva's general insurance business. She was then headhunted to become deputy chief finance officer at Standard Life, also in the UK, joining in 2009. In 2010 she was promoted to chief financial officer, after the previous CFO, David Nish, became chief executive. In this capacity she helped transform the life insurer into a diverse savings, pensions and asset management business.

In 2013, she was recruited to be chief executive of Prudential UK and Europe, and a board member of Prudential plc. Some saw her as a potential successor to Prudential's group chief executive, Tidjane Thiam. Instead, a few months after Thiam was succeeded by Mike Wells, Hunt left suddenly, in October 2015. It was suggested that a clash of personalities might have been involved.

In March 2016, Hunt was appointed to the management board of Allianz SE, the Munich-based multinational financial services company, with responsibility for asset management and US life insurance. Starting in the role that July, she took over a division that includes Allianz Global Investors (which manages €338bn of third-party assets); Allianz's US life insurance business; and California-based asset management business PIMCO, which was struggling when she joined, but which she was credited with turning around. Altogether, the division has around $2.25 trillion under management.

Since July 2016, Hunt had been chairman of Allianz Life Insurance Co NA, and of Allianz Asset Management GmbH.

Hunt resigned from her position at Allianz SE in September 2021. According to press reports her resignation was due to the loss of billions of euros in certain structured funds managed by the Allianz asset management unit.

She is also a Member of the Board of Trustees, American Institute of Contemporary German Studies at Johns Hopkins University, and a former Commissioner for the UK's Independent Dormant Assets Commission. She sits on the executive committee of the US Council on Competitiveness; and is a member of the Women In Africa Club.

After joining Allianz, Hunt spoke about her “personal crusade” to bring more diversity into the companies she managed, and was described as “passionate about supporting diversity and inclusion initiatives”. She argued that “diverse groups make much better decisions” and believed that, although “some organisations are making real progress on diversity” in financial services, “some others are not making progress or are going backwards”.

She also spoke about the importance of responsible capitalism and sustainable growth, arguing that companies like Allianz are stewards of our society with a responsibility to help “build a more equal world” and that business leaders should accept “that they have to deal with climate change”.

Hunt, who describes herself as a “pragmatist”, believes that her gender brings her under special scrutiny: “On the one hand, it is an honour to take on a kind of pioneering role for women, but you are also much more closely monitored. It's a big responsibility.” At Allianz, she has been noted for her “calm, reserved manner”, saying at her first official presentation that “I would rather deliver results than be known for big announcements that I can then not fulfil.” She does not believe in “star” fund managers and is reported to use a coffee mug that carries the word “integrity” in six languages.

During her time on the board of Allianz Manager Magazin repeatedly named Hunt in its annual list of the most influential woman in German business, while Bloomberg News described her as “one of the most important people in global finance” and dubbed her “the $2-trillion woman”.

== Personal life ==
Hunt, who is married with a son and a daughter, lives mainly in Munich but spends about half of each month visiting Allianz's other operations around the world. She remains interested in geology, enjoys travelling with her family, and also loves opera. She has paid tribute to her husband, with whom she shares housework and cooking, for helping her to maintain a work-life balance.
