= Diekmann =

Diekmann is a surname. Notable people with the surname include:

- Bruno Diekmann (1897–1982), German politician
- Jake Diekman (born 1987), American baseball player
- Kai Diekmann (born 1964), German journalist
- Michael Diekmann (born 1954), German businessman
- Miep Diekmann (1925–2017), Dutch children's writer
