= Health and Ageing =

Health and Ageing is a research programme set up by the Geneva Association, also known as the International Association for the Study of Insurance Economics. The Geneva Association Research Programme on Health and Ageing seeks to bring together facts, figures and analyses linked to issues in health. The key is to test new and promising ideas, linking them to related studies and initiatives in the health sector and trying to find solutions for the future financing of healthcare.

Major concerns are generally directed at the rising health costs resulting from technological advances and the changing demographic structure where the population over 60 largely exceeds other sectors. Importance is placed on two major issues:

- The change in demographic structures leading to the perceived "ageing society"
- The technological advances, which are perceived as resulting in increasing health costs

It is important to view these issues from the proper perspective. We are not ageing as a society but benefiting from an extended period of good health, which is largely a consequence of technological advances. It is not the increased spending on health that should be the concern but what it is spent on. It is crucial that spending is targeted and appropriately controlled with respect to the intended aim. Demographic changes and technological progress are driving changes in the governments' finances; the proportion of people in work compared with those already retired will decrease, leading to shrinking the tax base. The difficulties of financing the care of an increasing number of elderly people for increasingly long periods combined with an ever-shrinking tax base are very great. Faced with the growing health expenditure, changes have affected entire healthcare systems. The main trend in most developed countries is a creeping decentralization combined with a change in funding emphasis from public to a mix of public and private.

As the life cycle is getting longer, people have the opportunity to be productive for a longer period of time than ever before, which will therefore extend the period of wealth accumulation. This can allow funds or premiums to build up over a long period in order to cover the cost of care in the later stages of life. A good balance of the two complementarity systems public and private appears to be the best way to cope with the increase in health cost. To what extent could such mechanisms be managed in conjunction with building up pension or retirement funds? Would this imply that for some markets, in respect to certain products and circumstances we could adopt a common and coordinated approach to life and health insurance?

== Selected Key Issues ==
- The integration of long-term care in health insurance system
- The effect of technology on future health insurance cost
- Cost of intervention and technological advances in medicine
- Long term health care insurance and long-term health risks
- Development of health care systems and the capitalization issue
- The evolution of Health Maintenance Organizations
- Health issues for an ageing population in the workplace

== Publications ==
- Health and Ageing, Geneva Association Information Newsletter, The Geneva Association
- Etudes et Dossiers, Working Paper Series, The Geneva Association
- The Geneva Risk and Insurance Review, formerly The Geneva Papers on Risk and Insurance Theory (until March 2005), The Geneva Association & Springer
- Special Issue on Health, The Geneva Papers on Risk and Insurance - Issues and Practice, Vol.29 - No.4 / October 2004, Palgrave Macmillan
- Special Issue on Health, The Geneva Papers on Risk and Insurance - Issues and Practice, Vol.28 - No.2 / April 2003, Palgrave Macmillan
- Problems and Perspectives of Health Insurance, The Geneva Papers on Risk and Insurance - Issues and Practice, No.45 / October 1987
