= Oliver Bäte =

German business executive

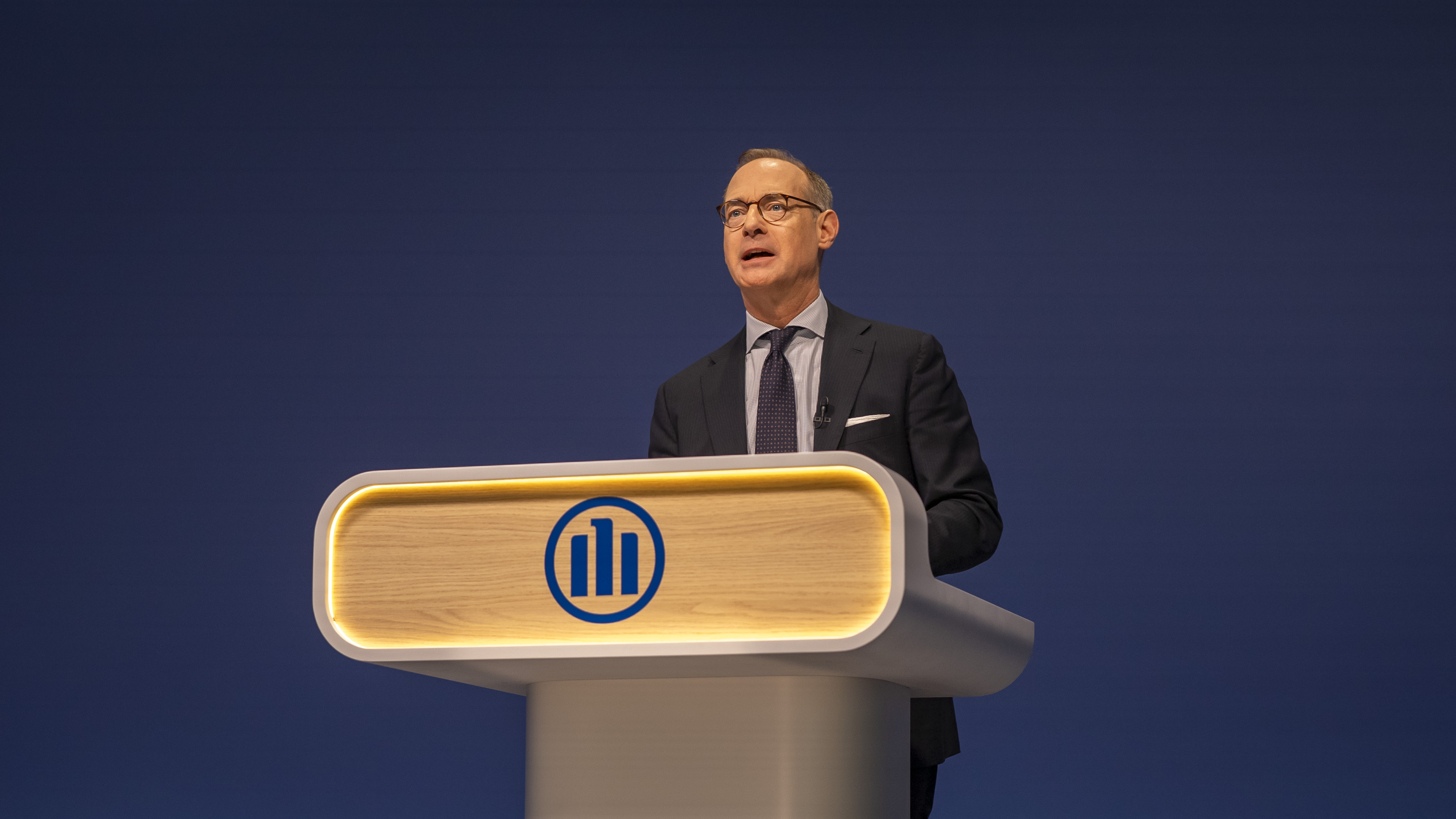
- Oliver Bäte speaking to Allianz Shareholders at the 2025 Allianz Annual General Meeting
- Born: 1 March 1965 (age 61)
- Education: University of Cologne and New York University Stern School of Business
- Employer: Allianz

Oliver Bäte (born 1 March 1965) is a German business executive who has been the CEO of Allianz since October 2014.

He is a member of the Trilateral Commission.

== Early life ==
Bäte graduated from the University of Cologne and New York University Stern School of Business.

== Career ==
Bäte served with the German Air Force from 1986 until 1987.

Bäte started his career with McKinsey & Company in New York. Later, he moved to their offices in Germany. In 1998, he took over McKinsey's German insurance practice. In 2003, he became director in charge of the firm's European insurance and asset management sector.

Bäte joined Allianz's board in 2008, as chief operating officer (COO) and chief financial officer (CFO) before taking responsibility for insurance operations in Western and Southern Europe (France, Benelux, Italy, Greece, Turkey) in 2013. As part of a 2015 executive reshuffle to cut the size of the Allianz management board to nine members, he also took over responsibility for human resources.

In his role at Allianz, Bäte was also part of Chancellor Angela Merkel’s delegation during her 2018 state visit to China.

In October 2023, Bäte was appointed to the Board of Directors of active cyber insurance provider Coalition.

== Other activities ==
=== Government agencies ===
- Monetary Authority of Singapore (MAS), Member of the International Advisory Panel (since 2015)

=== Non-profit organizations ===
- Baden-Badener Unternehmer-Gespräche (BBUG), Member of the Board of Trustees
- Council on Foreign Relations (CFR), Member of the Global Board of Advisors
- Stifterverband für die Deutsche Wissenschaft, Member of the Board
- Munich Security Conference, Member of the Advisory Council
- Schmalenbach Society, Member of the Advisory Council
- Trilateral Commission, Member of the European Group
- The B Team, Member (since 2016)
- World Economic Forum (WEF), Member of the Stewardship Board of the Initiative on Shaping the Future of Financial and Monetary Systems (2017)
- European Financial Services Roundtable (EFR), Member
- Pan-European Insurance Forum (PEIF), Chairman
- Geneva Association, Vice Chairman
- Institute of International Finance (IFF), Member of the Board
