= Manufacturers Mutual Insurance =

- Company type: Public
- Traded as: ASX: MMU
- Industry: Insurance
- Founded: 1914
- Defunct: 2000
- Headquarters: Sydney, Australia
- Area served: Australia
- Products: Workers' Compensation; Business Insurance; Home Insurance; Car Insurance; Pleasurecraft Insurance
- Subsidiaries: Combrook; DirecDial; SafetyNet; Club Marine

Manufacturers Mutual Insurance was an Australian insurance company founded in 1914 primarily targeting the Workers' Compensation market. It was renamed Manufacturers Mutual Insurance in 1920.

In 1960 the company acquired the Western Australian Insurance Company, expanding again in 1989 with the acquisition of Chamber of Manufacturers Insurance. The final acquisition was Switzerland Insurance Australia in 1993.

The company was known for its subsidiary lines, starting in 1987 with Combrook, an injury rehabilitation provider, and 1997 introducing DirecDial Financial Services and SafetyNet Services. DirecDial and SafetyNet was later integrated within the mainline businesses. Combrook was never integrated and remained a separate company as Workers' Compensation legislation prohibits insurance companies from also being the rehabilitation provider due to conflict of interest.

MMI was listed on the Australian Securities Exchange in 1994 with the Chamber of Manufacturers retaining a 40% shareholding. It was taken over by Allianz in 1998 though it continued to trade as MMI. The company was rebranded as Allianz Australia in 2000 when the company then ceased.
