= Tank & Rast =

German motorway services company

Coordinates: 50.7051°N 7.1461°E

Autobahn Tank & Rast Gruppe GmbH & Co. KG
- Type: GmbH
- Industry: Motorway service areas and filling stations
- Founded: 1951 (GfN), 1994 (Tank & Rast)
- Headquarters: Bonn, Germany
- Key people: Peter Markus Löw (CEO); Lutz Scharpe (CFO); Hans Fux (COO)
- Revenue: €537 million (2021)
- Number of employees: 1,050 (2021)
- Website: tank.rast.de

Autobahn Tank & Rast Gruppe GmbH & Co. KG is a private German motorway services company headquartered in Bonn. It holds the concession for the vast majority of motorway service areas and associated filling stations on the German Autobahn network. In addition to fuel sales, it operates or licenses restaurants, hotels and related roadside services.

== History ==
Tank & Rast was founded in 1994 as the successor to two federal companies, the Gesellschaft für Nebenbetriebe der Bundesautobahnen and the Ostdeutsche Autobahntankstellengesellschaft.

In 1998, the federal government privatised the enterprise. Political guidelines for the sale included maintaining the existing motorway refuelling and rest system, preserving a medium-sized leaseholder structure and avoiding monopolies. Shares were sold to Lufthansa (30.6%) and private-equity investors including Apax and Allianz-subsidiary Allianz Capital Partners. The sale generated around 1.2 billion DM.

From 2004 to 2007 the British private-equity firm Terra Firma Capital Partners was the sole owner, having acquired Tank & Rast for about €1.1 billion. In 2007 the Deutsche Bank infrastructure fund RREEF purchased 50 percent for about €1.2 billion.

The company has developed several brands for its service areas, in particular Serways, which was rolled out nationally after a pilot phase in the mid-2000s. In 2009 Tank & Rast acquired the Axxe service-area network from the retail group Metro.

In August 2015, Tank & Rast was sold for around €3.5 billion to a consortium consisting of Allianz Capital Partners, MEAG, the Abu Dhabi Investment Authority and the Canadian infrastructure fund OMERS Infrastructure.

== Operations ==
Tank & Rast oversees four main business areas: filling stations, motorway service areas, truck stops and directly operated outlets. According to company figures it controls concessions at roughly 93 percent of German motorway service areas, operating a network of over 400 service areas, more than 300 filling stations and several dozen hotels.

The company is also responsible for the roll-out of fast-charging infrastructure for electric vehicles at many German motorway sites, working with several charging-network operators. Since the mid-2010s it has supported federal initiatives to install combined CHAdeMO, CCS and Type-2 charging points at service areas.

Sanifair is a wholly owned subsidiary that operates toilet and sanitary facilities at many Tank & Rast sites. It introduced a paid-access system in the early 2000s, initially charging €0.50, redeemable in full against purchases. The fee was later raised to €0.70 and then to €1.00, with the value issued as a voucher that can be redeemed only on certain products, not on fuel.
