= Daniel Ivascyn =

American businessman (born 1969)

- Born: September 8, 1969 (age 57); Oxford, Massachusetts, U.S.
- Education: Occidental College (B.A.); University of Chicago Booth School of Business (M.B.A)
- Employer: PIMCO
- Title: chief investment officer

Daniel John Ivascyn (born September 8, 1969) is an American investor and group chief investment officer for PIMCO.

Ivascyn was born in Oxford, Massachusetts on September 8, 1969. His mom was a nurse and his father was a school superintendent. He holds a B.A. degree in economics from Occidental College and an M.B.A from the University of Chicago Booth School of Business.

Ivascyn joined PIMCO in 1998 following stints with Bear Stearns, T. Rowe Price, and Fidelity Investments. He became CIO of PIMCO in 2014.
