= Emmanuel Roman =

French financial executive (b. 1963)

- Born: 27 August 1963 (age 63); Paris, France
- Education: Paris Dauphine University; University of Chicago Booth School of Business
- Occupations: CEO, PIMCO
- Known for: Investment management Philanthropy
- Spouses: Barrie Sardoff (m. 1992; div. 2016) Topaz Page-Green (m. 2019)
- Children: 4

Emmanuel "Manny" Roman (born 27 August 1963) is a French financial executive. He is the chief executive officer (CEO) and a managing director of PIMCO, a fixed-income investment management firm based in Newport Beach, California.

== Early life and education ==
Roman grew up in Paris, the only child of the artists Philippe Roman and Véronique Jordan Roman. He attended École Alsacienne, and earned a bachelor's degree in applied mathematics from the University of Paris IX Dauphine in 1985. He later received an MBA in Finance and Econometrics from the University of Chicago Booth School of Business.

== Career ==
Roman was co-head of Worldwide Equity Derivatives at Goldman Sachs from 1996 to 2000 and subsequently served as co-head of Worldwide Global Securities Services at Goldman Sachs beginning in 2000.

In 2005, Roman joined GLG Partners, a discretionary investment management firm, as co-CEO. GLG Partners became a publicly traded company in 2007. In 2010, GLG was acquired by Man Group, and Roman was appointed president and chief operating officer. He joined Man Group's executive board in 2011 and became CEO the following year.

In October 2016, Roman was appointed CEO of PIMCO, an investment management company headquartered in Newport Beach, California. He is a member of the firm’s executive committee and oversees its client and business operations.

Roman has been a University of Chicago Trustee since 2015. In 2023, Roman donated to the Center for Decision Research (CDR) at the University of Chicago Booth School of Business.

== Personal life ==
Roman married Barrie Sardoff in 1992, with whom he has two daughters. They divorced in 2016. As of October 2025, Roman lives in Los Angeles with his wife, Topaz Page-Green, and two of his four children.
