= List of largest insurance companies =

Company ranking

These are lists of the insurance companies in the world, as measured by total non-banking assets and by net premiums written.

== By assets ==
The list is based on the 2025 report of the 25 largest insurance companies in the world by 2024 assets from AM Best.

Rank	Company	Country	Total assets (US$ Billion)
1	Allianz	Germany	1,085.2
2	Berkshire Hathaway	United States	1,069.9
3	China Life Insurance	China	957.8
4	Ping An Insurance	China	848.1
5	Prudential Financial	United States	721.1
6	Axa	France	711.3
7	MetLife	United States	687.5
8	Legal & General	United Kingdom	664.7
9	Manulife Financial	Canada	660.9
10	Nippon Life	Japan	645.1
11	Assicurazioni Generali	Italy	663.9
12	American International Group	United States	596.1
13	Life Insurance Corporation	India	560.3
14	Japan Post Insurance	Japan	551.0
15	CNP Assurances	France	547.0
16	Dai-ichi Life	Japan	540.4
17	Aegon N.V.	Netherlands	531.0
18	Credit Agricole Assurances	France	502.7
19	Great-West Lifeco	Canada	493.4
20	Aviva	United Kingdom	483.6
21	JA Kyosai	Japan	481.7
22	Zurich Insurance Group	Switzerland	435.8
23	New York Life Insurance Company	United States	428.6
24	Meiji Yasuda Life	Japan	395.4
25	Lincoln Natl Corp	United States	387.3

== By net premiums written ==
The list is based on the 2023 report of the 25 largest insurance companies in the world by 2021 net premiums written from AM Best.

Rank	Company	Country	Net premiums written (US$ Billion)
1	UnitedHealth Group	United States	226.2
2	Centene Corporation	United States	120.3
3	Elevance Health	United States	117.4
4	China Life Insurance	China	115.1
5	Ping An Insurance	China	114.7
6	Kaiser Permanente	United States	106.4
7	Axa	France	95.7
8	Allianz	Germany	88.9
9	People's Insurance Company of China	China	84.5
10	Assicurazioni Generali	Italy	80.3
11	Humana	United States	79.8
12	Berkshire Hathaway	United States	71.6
13	State Farm	United States	71.1
14	Munich Re	Germany	64.7
15	CVS Health	United States	62.2
16	Life Insurance Corporation	India	56.6
17	China Pacific Insurance Company	China	53.7
18	Health Care Service Corporation	United States	46.7
19	Progressive Corporation	United States	46.4
20	The Allstate Corp	United States	45.8
21	Zurich Ins Group Ltd	Switzerland	44.8
22	HDI	Germany	44.2
23	Liberty Mutual	United States	43.7
24	Dai-ichi Life	Japan	43.4
25	Nippon Life	Japan	43.2
