= Elenia =

Finnish distributor of electrical energy

- Industry: Energy
- Headquarters: Tampere, Finland
- Number of employees: 270
- Website: www.elenia.fi

Elenia is a Finnish distributor of electrical energy with 430,000 customers. It covers more than 100 municipalities in Kanta-Häme, Päijät-Häme, Pirkanmaa, Central Finland, Southern Ostrobothnia and Northern Ostrobothnia.

The Elenia Group comprises Elenia Oy and its wholly owned electricity network operator, Elenia Verkko Oyj. Elenia is owned by the State Pension Fund of Finland, Allianz Capital Partners, and Macquarie Infrastructure and Real Assets.

== History ==
In 2011, the Swedish company Vattenfall sold its electricity distribution and heating operations in Finland to a company named LNI Acquisition for 1.54 billion euros. LNI was backed by the pension insurance company Ilmarinen, Goldman Sachs, and 3i. Following the sale, LNI changed its name to Elenia.

In December 2017, Goldman Sachs, 3i, and Ilmarinen sold Elenia to Allianz, Macquarie Infrastructure and Real Assets, and the State Pension Fund of Finland.

Until the end of 2019, the company providing energy services was named Elenia Palvelut Oy. It is now part of Elenia Oy.

In July 2019, Elenia sold Elenia Lämpö Oy (currently Loimua), which was previously part of the group. The buyers were SL Capital Infrastructure II SCSP, DIF Infrastructure V Coöperatief U.A, and LPPI Infrastructure Investments LP.

== Business Operations ==
Elenia Verkko Oyj is an electricity network operator serving 442,000 household, corporate, and public sector customers across more than one hundred municipalities in Kanta-Häme, Päijät-Häme, Pirkanmaa, Central Finland, as well as South and North Ostrobothnia. Elenia ensures the functionality and renewal of the electricity network and builds the network and connections in cooperation with its partner companies. The company measures its customers' electricity consumption and provides energy data to electricity retailers. Elenia is the second largest of Finland's approximately 80 network operators.
