= Jamil Baz =

British businessman

Jamil Baz is a financial economist, academic, and managing director at PIMCO.

== Early life ==
Baz was born in 1959 into a Christian Lebanese family. He was schooled at the Jesuit college, Notre Dame de Jamhour, in Lebanon. He pursued his studies in France, the UK and the US. He earned a Diploma from the Ecole des Hautes Etudes Commerciales, an M.Sc. from the London School of Economics, a master's degree from the Massachusetts Institute of Technology Sloan School of Management, and an MA and a Ph.D. from Harvard University.

== Career ==
Baz is a managing director at PIMCO. Prior to this, he was a senior managing director and chief investment strategist of the Man Group, a managing director in the Proprietary Trading Group of Goldman Sachs, chief investment strategist of Deutsche Bank, and managing director of Lehman Brothers.

He started his career at the World Bank where he traded the derivatives portfolio and advised Central Banks on the management of foreign exchange reserves and external debt.

He teaches financial economics at Oxford University, and is on the teaching staff of the Mathematical Institute, University of Oxford; he has also taught at Georgetown University and Harvard University.

== Personal life ==
He is married to Zeina Farhat and has three children: Maurice, Elena and Alexandra.
