= Allianz Global Investors =

Global investment management firm

- Type: Subsidiary
- Industry: Financial services
- Founded: 1998 - Creation of separate investment unit within Allianz; 2012 - Establishment of a globally integrated investment firm
- Number of locations: 21
- Area served: Worldwide
- Key people: Tobias C. Pross (CEO)
- Services: Investment management
- AUM: €591 billion (2025)
- Number of employees: 2,900
- Parent: Allianz
- Website: www.allianzgi.com

Allianz Global Investors (commonly called AllianzGI), is a global investment management firm with offices in 21 locations worldwide. It is owned by the global insurance and financial services group Allianz. Employing nearly 3,000, it manages over EUR 590 billion in assets on behalf of institutional, retail clients and also Allianz itself, covers asset classes including equities, fixed income, multi asset and private markets. AllianzGI became known for fraud case in which its Structured Alpha fund lost over 6 billion dollars in the 2020 market sell-off. As the risk profile of the fund was missold to the investors it led to charges against the company and its managers.

== History ==
Allianz first created a separate asset management business in 1974 under the leadership of board member, Joachim Faber. Through a combination of asset management acquisitions as well as acquisitions of other businesses that had asset management units, Allianz established a large asset management division comprising different investment 'boutiques'. Allianz Global Investors was established as a dedicated asset management business in 1998. Since then, they have grown into one of the world’s leading active asset managers.

In 2011, a decision was taken to combine most of the different investment managers into a globally integrated asset manager; from 2012 Allianz moved to what they call a "two pillar" model where Allianz Global Investors and PIMCO operate separately from each other despite common ownership.

By December 2025, assets under management by Allianz Global Investors were EUR 591 billion; these assets were split between investments in equities (25%), fixed income (30%), multi asset (29%) and private markets (16%).

=== Structured Alpha Fraud ===
During the March 2020 market sell-off, the Structured Alpha funds lost over 6 billion USD leading to accusation that the funds misled investors (such as pension funds) about their risk profile. On 1 August 2021, the United States Department of Justice began a probe into AllianzGI's Structured Alpha Funds with the German Federal Financial Supervisory Authority launching an investigation later in 2021. In 2022 Allianz pleaded guilty to criminal securities fraud and agreed to pay over 6 billion USD in one of the largest cases so far. The funds former manager, Gregoire Tournant, was indicted for fraud, conspiracy and obstruction and two other portfolio managers, Stephen Bond-Nelson and Trevor Taylor, pleaded guilty to charges of fraud and conspiracy.

== Leadership ==
Tobias C. Pross is chief executive officer (CEO) of Allianz Global Investors, a position he has held since the start of 2020. Prior to 2020, Allianz Global Investors was led by Andreas Utermann.
