= Cynet (company) =

Cyber security company

- Type: Private
- Industry: Information security, Cybersecurity
- Founded: 2015
- Founders: Eyal Gruner, Netanel Amar
- Headquarters: Boston, United States
- Key people: Jason Magee (CEO)
- Products: All in One, AI-powered cybersecurity platform that unifies protection, detection, and response - backed by 24x7 expert support
- Number of employees: 234 (2021)
- Website: cynet.com

Cynet is a cybersecurity company. It converges essential cybersecurity technologies that help enterprises to identify security loopholes, threat intelligence, and manage endpoint security. It was founded in 2015 in Tel-Aviv, Israel, and is headquartered in Boston, United States.

== History ==
Eyal Gruner and Netanel Amar are the co-founders of Cynet.

In 2015, a team of researchers from Cynet and BugSec discovered vulnerabilities in Next Generation Firewalls. In 2016, they discovered a major security problem in LG G3 smartphones, leaving millions of devices at risk.

In June 2018, Cynet received $13 million in investment from Ibex Investors, Norwest Venture Partners, and Shlomo Kramer.

In March 2021, Cynet raised a 40 million dollar Series C funding round.

== Cynet 360 ==
Cynet 360 Incidence Response Tool is an all-in-one breach protection platform of Cynet which uses machine learning, artificial intelligence, and automation to manage vulnerabilities and threat intelligence, analyze user behavior, and give endpoint protection within a centrally unified system. It supports SaaS, IaaS, hybrid, and on-premises deployments.
