= Captive unit =

Offshore business entity

A captive unit is a business unit of a company functioning offshore as an entity of its own while retaining the work and close operational tie ups within the parent company.

Captive unit is one way of establishing presence in cheap labour markets such as China and India rather than outsourcing work to third party companies established offshore.

Captive Generating plant means a power plant set up by any person to generate electricity primarily for his or her own use and includes a power plant set up by any co-operative society or association of persons for generating electricity primarily for use of members of such co-operative society or association. Note that the word primarily is not defined anywhere. Also note that by this definition, a group of industries can set up a big generating station for their groups use and sell excess power.
