= Allianz Life =

Provides annuities and life insurance products in the United States

- Formerly: North American Casualty (1896-1912); North American Life and Casualty (1912-1993)
- Type: Subsidiary
- Industry: Financial services
- Founded: 1896; 130 years ago
- Headquarters: Golden Valley, Minnesota
- Key people: Jasmine Jirele (CEO)
- Products: Insurance
- Parent: Allianz
- Website: allianzlife.com

Allianz Life is an American life insurance company owned by German global financial services group Allianz. The company provides services in all states except for New York, where annuities and life insurance products are offered by Allianz Life Insurance Company of New York.

Allianz Life offers various products, including fixed and variable annuities and life insurance. These products are offered through a network of more than 100,000 agents nationwide.

The company is a principal subsidiary of Allianz, a European global financial services group that is the 31st largest corporation in the world based on revenue (Fortune Global 500, July 2013). Allianz SE employs nearly 155,000 people worldwide.

== History ==
Allianz Life Insurance Company of North America began as North American Casualty, started by Henry M. Little of Minneapolis, Minnesota in 1896. In 1912, North American Casualty merged with North American Life Association – founded in 1905 by Zeke H. Austin with capital from Henry Little – to become North American Life and Casualty (NALAC). Howell Palmeroy Skoglund (known as H. P. Skoglund) was the company's president from 1933 to 1965 as well as one of the original owners of the Minnesota Vikings.

In 1979, North American Life and Casualty Co. was acquired by Allianz, a German conglomerate, which renamed the company Allianz Life Insurance Co. of North America in 1993.

Today, Allianz Life and Allianz Life of NY are the only Allianz Group subsidiaries providing life insurance in the U.S.

In 2010, Allianz Life was recognized by the Minneapolis Star Tribune as one of the top 100 workplaces in the Twin Cities, ranking fifth on the list of top public companies. Allianz Life was also honored that year as one of Minneapolis/St. Paul Business Journal’s Best Places to Work winners, ranking eighth on the list of large companies with more than 1,000 full-time Minnesota employees.

On July 25, 2017, Allianz became the title sponsor of MLS's Minnesota United FC stadium in Saint Paul, Allianz Field.

In July 2020, SIMON Annuities and Insurance Services LLC agreed to add Allianz Life Insurance Company of North America to the Raymond James investment management annuity network and digital marketplace.

In July 2025, Allianz Life reported a cyber security incident in June 2025, in which the data about "a majority" of its clients was stolen.

On December 2025, Allianz became the Worldwide Insurance Partner of the International Olympic and Paralympic Movements of the 2026 Winter Olympics, as well as the 2028 Summer Olympic and Paralympic Games

In July 2026, HSBC announced to sell their health and life insurance business to Allianz. The transaction is expected to close in 2027.

== See Also ==
List of United States Insurance Companies
