= PIMCO =

American investment management firm

Pacific Investment Management Company LLC

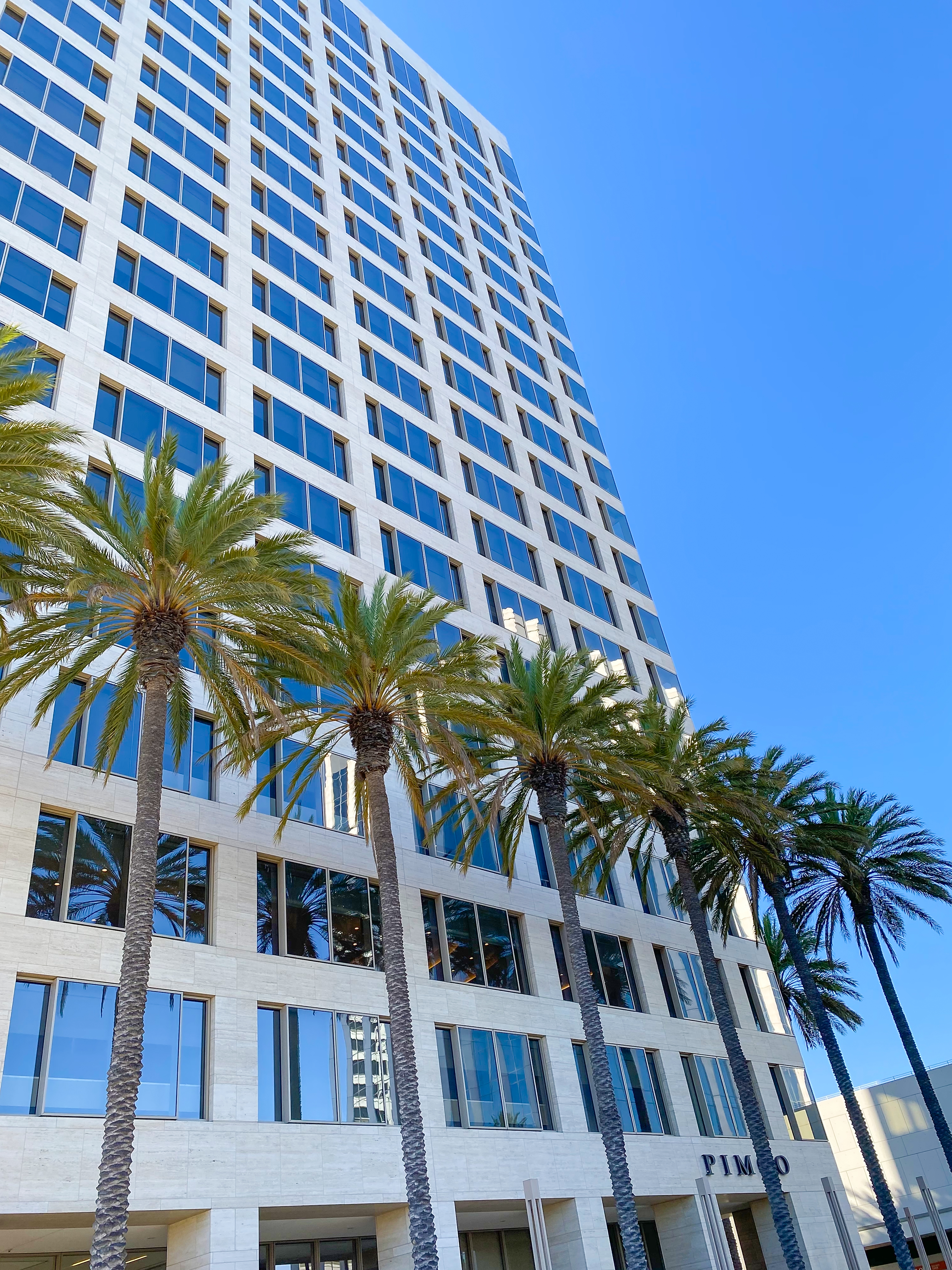
- PIMCO headquarters at 650 Newport Center Drive in Newport Beach, California
- Company type: Limited liability company
- Industry: Financial services
- Founded: 1971; 55 years ago
- Founders: Bill Gross; Jim Muzzy; Bill Podlich
- Headquarters: Newport Beach, California, U.S.
- Key people: Emmanuel Roman (CEO); Dan Ivascyn (CIO)
- Services: Investment management
- AUM: US$2.26 trillion (December 31, 2025)
- Number of employees: 3,195+
- Parent: Allianz SE
- Website: www.pimco.com

Pacific Investment Management Company LLC (PIMCO) is an American investment management firm. While it has a specific focus on active fixed income management worldwide, it manages investments in many asset classes, including fixed income, equities and other financial assets across public and private markets. PIMCO is one of the largest investment managers, actively managing more than $2 trillion in assets for central banks, sovereign wealth funds, pension funds, corporations, foundations and endowments, as well as individual investors around the world. According to the Sovereign Wealth Fund Institute, PIMCO is the 6th-largest asset manager in the world by managed AUM.

PIMCO's headquarters are in Newport Beach, California, near the Pacific Ocean. The firm has over 3,100 employees working in 22 offices throughout the Americas, Europe, and Asia. PIMCO and Allianz Global Investors manage around €2.5 trillion of third-party assets. PIMCO is also the world's largest active ETF manager (as well as one of the first to introduce actively managed ETFs).

== History ==
PIMCO initially functioned as a unit of Pacific Life Insurance Co., managing separate accounts for that insurer's clients. The firm was founded in 1971, launching with $12 million of assets. In 2000, PIMCO was acquired by Allianz SE, a large global financial services company based in Munich, Germany, but the firm continues to operate as an autonomous subsidiary of Allianz.

On September 26, 2014, it was announced that Bill Gross, co-founder and former chief investment officer (dubbed the "Bond King" in the investment arena), was stepping down to join Janus Capital Group. In April 2015, PIMCO announced the hire of former Federal Reserve Chairman Dr. Ben Bernanke as a senior advisor, following in the footsteps of predecessor Federal Reserve Chairman Alan Greenspan.

== Leadership ==
PIMCO appointed Emmanuel Roman as CEO effective November 1, 2016. He succeeded Douglas M. Hodge, who was CEO from 2014 to 2016. According to PIMCO, the members of their global advisory board members are:

- Joshua Bolten, President and CEO of the Business Roundtable and former White House Chief of Staff.
- Gordon Brown, former UK Prime Minister and former Chancellor of the Exchequer.
- Michèle Flournoy, U.S. defense policy and national security expert, former U.S. Under Secretary of Defense for Policy.
- Raghuram Rajan, former Governor of the Reserve Bank of India and Former Chief Economist at the International Monetary Fund.

Apart from the board, Dan Ivascyn—the group chief investment officer (CIO)—broadly oversees portfolio management and investment strategy. There are also five other CIOs: Andrew Balls, CIO Global Fixed Income; Mark Kiesel, CIO Global Credit; Mohit Mittal, CIO Core Strategies; Marc Seidner, CIO Non-traditional Strategies; and Qi Wang, CIO Portfolio Implementation.

== Influence ==
Often referred to as a "Wall Street giant" and, more specifically, a "bond powerhouse," PIMCO commands significant influence in the financial industry, particularly in fixed income. The PIMCO Income Fund (NASDAQ:PIMIX) is the largest actively managed bond fund in the world.

According to data from Morningstar, PIMCO oversees a substantial portion of the world's largest actively managed bond funds, with three out of the top ten funds under its management, including the largest. Under Morningstar's rating system, 42 of PIMCO's mutual funds hold a 5-Star rating, and 90 funds hold a 4-Star rating.

In 2025, PIMCO had already privately lent nearly $6 billion to emerging market borrowers in 2025 - primarily governments. The firm has provided loans or privately structured bonds to countries including Panama, the Dominican Republic, Saudi Arabia, and Qatar. Emerging market governments are increasingly turning to private credit for more flexible borrowing options amid volatile market sentiment and the lingering effects of being shut out of capital markets during crises like the COVID-19 pandemic. Demand for these investment-grade private debt opportunities is high, particularly among U.S. insurance companies, which are seeking safer alternatives in light of equity market volatility.

== Notable employees ==
Notable former or current employees include:

- Robert D. Arnott
- Andrew Balls
- Jamil Baz
- Richard Clarida
- Mohamed A. El-Erian
- Bill H. Gross
- Daniel Ivascyn
- Neel Kashkari
- Daniel Lacalle
- Ng Kok Song
- Emmanuel Roman
- John J. Studzinski
- Ramin Toloui
- Jean-Claude Trichet
