= International Association for the Study of Insurance Economics =

International trade research organisation

- Abbreviation: The Geneva Association
- Formation: 1973; 53 years ago
- Founders: Fabio Padoa Schioppa, Raymond Barre, and Orio Giarini
- Type: Non-profit trade association
- Legal status: Association
- Purpose: Insurance industry research
- Location: Zurich, Switzerland
- Region served: Worldwide
- Services: Insurance research projects, industry publications, and forum for insurance industry leaders
- Official language: English
- Website: genevaassociation.org

The International Association for the Study of Insurance Economics (commonly known as The Geneva Association), is an international trade organisation that provides research for the insurance industry worldwide. It works on identifying fundamental trends and strategic issues related to insurance and acts as a forum for its members. Its members are insurance and reinsurance leaders of the major insurance companies worldwide.

== Overview ==
It promotes studies related to the interdependence between economics and insurance, to highlight the importance of risk and insurance economics as part of the modern general economic theory. It also sponsors and defines special aims for research programmes, stimulate and support academic and professional research work, and to diffuse knowledge and the results of research in risk and insurance economics worldwide.

== History ==
The association was founded when a constitutive assembly of The Geneva Association took place in Paris on 27 February 1973 at the headquarters of La Paternelle (which was later part of the AXA Group). A number of biggest European insurance companies were represented.

The Geneva Association has been the founding institution of the European Group of Risk and Insurance Economists (EGRIE) one of worldwide now three regional organisations that organise (mostly) academic experts in the fields of risk and insurance economics.

The Geneva Association is furthermore the catalytical non-academic organisation for the arrangement of the first world congress for risk and insurance economists which was jointly organised by American Risk and Insurance Association (ARIA), Asia-Pacific Risk and Insurance Association (APRIA), European Group of Risk and Insurance Economists (EGRIE) and the Geneva Association in 2005 in Salt Lake City.

== Selected key issues ==
- Further develop our understanding of the underlying theories concerning risk perception, management, transfer, and mitigation;
- Analyse and describe the mechanics of ideal and real insurance markets. Their organisation, functioning, role, and limitations;
- Work on the limits and complementary of public and private solutions to risk and insurance problems.

== Publications ==
- Insurance Economics, Geneva Association Information Newsletter, The Geneva Association
- Etudes et Dossiers, Working Paper Series, The Geneva Association
- The Geneva Risk and Insurance Review, formerly The Geneva Papers on Risk and Insurance Theory (until March 2005), The Geneva Association & Springer
- Law and Economics, International Liability Regimes, The Geneva Papers on Risk and Insurance - Issues and Practice, Vol.31 - No.2 / April 2006, Palgrave Macmillan
- Insurance Law and Economics, Regulation and Financial Stability, The Geneva Papers on Risk and Insurance - Issues and Practice, Vol.29 - No.2 / April 2004, Palgrave Macmillan
- Economic Issues in Insurance, Social Issues in Insurance, Insurance Worldwide, The Geneva Papers on Risk and Insurance - Issues and Practice, Vol.26 - No.3 / July 2001, Palgrave Macmillan
- Issues in Law and Economics, Financial Services and Insurance, The Geneva Papers on Risk and Insurance - Issues and Practice, Vol.25 - No.2 / April 2000, Palgrave Macmillan
- Issues in Law and Economics, The Geneva Papers on Risk and Insurance - Issues and Practice, No.87 / April 1998
- The Law and Economics of Insurance, The Geneva Papers on Risk and Insurance - Issues and Practice, No.78 / January 1996
- World Insurance, Economics Issues, The Geneva Papers on Risk and Insurance - Issues and Practice, No.75 / April 1995
- The Law and Economics of Insurance and of Services, The Geneva Papers on Risk and Insurance - Issues and Practice, No.70 / January 1994
- The Economics of Insurance, The Geneva Papers on Risk and Insurance - Issues and Practice, No.66 / January 1993
- Essays in Insurance Economics, The Geneva Papers on Risk and Insurance - Issues and Practice, No.50 / January 1989
- Essays in Insurance Economics, The Geneva Papers on Risk and Insurance - Issues and Practice, No.47 / April 1988
- Essays in Insurance Economics, The Geneva Papers on Risk and Insurance - Issues and Practice, No.42 / January 1987
