= List of minor planets: 578001–579000 =

The following is a partial list of minor planets, running from minor-planet number 578001 through 579000, inclusive. The primary data for this and other partial lists is based on JPL's "Small-Body Orbital Elements" and data available from the Minor Planet Center. Critical list information is also provided by the MPC, unless otherwise specified from Lowell Observatory. A detailed description of the table's columns and additional sources are given on the main page including a complete list of every page in this series, and a statistical break-up on the dynamical classification of minor planets.

Also see the summary list of all named bodies in numerical and alphabetical order, and the corresponding naming citations for the number range of this particular list. New namings may only be added to this list after official publication, as the preannouncement of names is condemned by the Working Group for Small Bodies Nomenclature of the International Astronomical Union.

Near-Earth obj.	MBA (inner)	MBA (outer)	Centaur
Mars-crosser	MBA (middle)	Jupiter trojan	Trans-Neptunian obj.
Unclassified

== 578001–578100 ==
Designation			Discovery			Properties		Ref
Permanent	Provisional	Named after	Date	Site	Discoverer(s)	Category	Diam.	Ref
578001	2013 UD_{23}	—	October 26, 2013	Mount Lemmon	Mount Lemmon Survey	·	1.6 km	MPC · JPL
578002	2013 UK_{29}	—	October 25, 2013	Mount Lemmon	Mount Lemmon Survey	·	1.2 km	MPC · JPL
578003	2013 UO_{31}	—	January 19, 2015	Mount Lemmon	Mount Lemmon Survey	·	1.7 km	MPC · JPL
578004	2013 UA_{33}	—	October 26, 2013	Mount Lemmon	Mount Lemmon Survey	·	1.5 km	MPC · JPL
578005	2013 UY_{33}	—	October 30, 2013	Haleakala	Pan-STARRS 1	·	1.4 km	MPC · JPL
578006	2013 UD_{36}	—	October 24, 2013	Mount Lemmon	Mount Lemmon Survey	·	1.4 km	MPC · JPL
578007	2013 UG_{42}	—	October 31, 2013	Mount Lemmon	Mount Lemmon Survey	L5	6.8 km	MPC · JPL
578008	2013 UF_{43}	—	October 24, 2013	Mount Lemmon	Mount Lemmon Survey	L5	6.6 km	MPC · JPL
578009	2013 VC_{3}	—	November 2, 2013	Palomar	Palomar Transient Factory	EUN	1.1 km	MPC · JPL
578010	2013 VP_{6}	—	November 16, 2009	Kitt Peak	Spacewatch	·	2.1 km	MPC · JPL
578011	2013 VC_{9}	—	January 27, 2004	Kitt Peak	Spacewatch	L5	10 km	MPC · JPL
578012	2013 VP_{14}	—	October 16, 2013	Catalina	CSS	·	1.7 km	MPC · JPL
578013	2013 VE_{16}	—	July 19, 2013	Haleakala	Pan-STARRS 1	(5)	1.2 km	MPC · JPL
578014	2013 VU_{20}	—	November 20, 2000	Apache Point	SDSS Collaboration	(1547)	1.4 km	MPC · JPL
578015	2013 VW_{24}	—	November 6, 2013	Mount Lemmon	Mount Lemmon Survey	·	2.4 km	MPC · JPL
578016	2013 VM_{26}	—	December 18, 2009	Kitt Peak	Spacewatch	·	1.3 km	MPC · JPL
578017	2013 VF_{27}	—	November 1, 2013	Kitt Peak	Spacewatch	·	1.5 km	MPC · JPL
578018	2013 VN_{27}	—	May 26, 2011	Mount Lemmon	Mount Lemmon Survey	·	1.8 km	MPC · JPL
578019	2013 VV_{27}	—	November 11, 2004	Kitt Peak	Spacewatch	·	1.7 km	MPC · JPL
578020	2013 VZ_{28}	—	November 9, 2013	Mount Lemmon	Mount Lemmon Survey	·	1.7 km	MPC · JPL
578021	2013 VC_{29}	—	November 9, 2013	Mount Lemmon	Mount Lemmon Survey	·	1.2 km	MPC · JPL
578022	2013 VG_{29}	—	November 9, 2013	Haleakala	Pan-STARRS 1	·	1.2 km	MPC · JPL
578023	2013 VH_{29}	—	April 28, 2011	Haleakala	Pan-STARRS 1	·	2.3 km	MPC · JPL
578024	2013 VO_{29}	—	November 9, 2013	Haleakala	Pan-STARRS 1	·	1.3 km	MPC · JPL
578025	2013 VL_{31}	—	November 1, 2013	Kitt Peak	Spacewatch	·	1.0 km	MPC · JPL
578026	2013 VV_{31}	—	November 9, 2013	Haleakala	Pan-STARRS 1	·	1.6 km	MPC · JPL
578027	2013 VB_{32}	—	November 7, 2013	Kitt Peak	Spacewatch	·	1.4 km	MPC · JPL
578028	2013 VF_{32}	—	October 27, 2013	Mount Bigelow	CSS	·	1.4 km	MPC · JPL
578029	2013 VM_{32}	—	June 25, 2010	WISE	WISE	·	2.4 km	MPC · JPL
578030	2013 VW_{32}	—	November 12, 2013	Kitt Peak	Spacewatch	·	1.3 km	MPC · JPL
578031	2013 VL_{34}	—	January 27, 2015	Haleakala	Pan-STARRS 1	·	1.4 km	MPC · JPL
578032	2013 VL_{41}	—	December 18, 2001	Socorro	LINEAR	T_{j} (2.96)	1.5 km	MPC · JPL
578033	2013 VK_{42}	—	January 18, 2015	Haleakala	Pan-STARRS 1	EOS	1.5 km	MPC · JPL
578034	2013 VN_{42}	—	November 2, 2013	Kitt Peak	Spacewatch	·	1.5 km	MPC · JPL
578035	2013 VZ_{42}	—	November 4, 2013	Mount Lemmon	Mount Lemmon Survey	·	1.4 km	MPC · JPL
578036	2013 VT_{46}	—	November 20, 2014	Haleakala	Pan-STARRS 1	L5	6.3 km	MPC · JPL
578037	2013 VU_{46}	—	November 9, 2013	Haleakala	Pan-STARRS 1	WIT	780 m	MPC · JPL
578038	2013 VQ_{47}	—	November 9, 2013	Haleakala	Pan-STARRS 1	·	1.2 km	MPC · JPL
578039	2013 VH_{51}	—	November 10, 2013	Mount Lemmon	Mount Lemmon Survey	·	1.8 km	MPC · JPL
578040	2013 VF_{52}	—	November 1, 2013	Mount Lemmon	Mount Lemmon Survey	·	1.1 km	MPC · JPL
578041	2013 VJ_{52}	—	November 11, 2013	Mount Lemmon	Mount Lemmon Survey	·	1.6 km	MPC · JPL
578042	2013 VV_{52}	—	November 10, 2013	Mount Lemmon	Mount Lemmon Survey	·	1.2 km	MPC · JPL
578043	2013 VL_{53}	—	November 1, 2013	Mount Lemmon	Mount Lemmon Survey	·	1.5 km	MPC · JPL
578044	2013 VZ_{53}	—	November 9, 2013	Haleakala	Pan-STARRS 1	·	1.6 km	MPC · JPL
578045	2013 VC_{54}	—	November 9, 2013	Mount Lemmon	Mount Lemmon Survey	·	1.6 km	MPC · JPL
578046	2013 VB_{58}	—	November 1, 2013	Mount Lemmon	Mount Lemmon Survey	·	1.5 km	MPC · JPL
578047	2013 VH_{58}	—	November 8, 2013	Mount Lemmon	Mount Lemmon Survey	·	1.5 km	MPC · JPL
578048	2013 VJ_{58}	—	November 10, 2013	Mount Lemmon	Mount Lemmon Survey	·	1.2 km	MPC · JPL
578049	2013 VO_{59}	—	November 4, 2013	Haleakala	Pan-STARRS 1	·	850 m	MPC · JPL
578050	2013 VP_{65}	—	December 29, 2008	Mount Lemmon	Mount Lemmon Survey	·	2.4 km	MPC · JPL
578051	2013 VQ_{65}	—	November 9, 2013	Haleakala	Pan-STARRS 1	·	1.3 km	MPC · JPL
578052	2013 VR_{65}	—	November 9, 2013	Haleakala	Pan-STARRS 1	·	2.3 km	MPC · JPL
578053 Jordillorca	2013 WD_{1}	Jordillorca	November 26, 2013	SM Montmagastrell	Bosch, J. M., Olivera, R.	·	2.3 km	MPC · JPL
578054	2013 WY_{1}	—	March 23, 2011	Bergisch Gladbach	W. Bickel	·	1.7 km	MPC · JPL
578055	2013 WK_{2}	—	April 1, 2003	Apache Point	SDSS	·	1.6 km	MPC · JPL
578056	2013 WS_{2}	—	May 4, 2002	Kitt Peak	Spacewatch	·	2.6 km	MPC · JPL
578057	2013 WT_{3}	—	August 7, 2000	Haleakala	NEAT	EUN	1.9 km	MPC · JPL
578058	2013 WL_{5}	—	September 30, 2013	Oukaïmeden	C. Rinner	·	2.2 km	MPC · JPL
578059	2013 WG_{6}	—	November 6, 2013	Haleakala	Pan-STARRS 1	·	1.1 km	MPC · JPL
578060	2013 WY_{7}	—	November 26, 2013	Mount Lemmon	Mount Lemmon Survey	·	1.2 km	MPC · JPL
578061	2013 WA_{8}	—	September 28, 2008	Mount Lemmon	Mount Lemmon Survey	WIT	850 m	MPC · JPL
578062	2013 WP_{8}	—	January 23, 2006	Kitt Peak	Spacewatch	AGN	1.1 km	MPC · JPL
578063	2013 WA_{13}	—	November 27, 2013	Haleakala	Pan-STARRS 1	·	1.9 km	MPC · JPL
578064	2013 WY_{13}	—	December 29, 2005	Kitt Peak	Spacewatch	(5)	1.0 km	MPC · JPL
578065	2013 WB_{14}	—	June 1, 2003	Kitt Peak	Spacewatch	·	2.1 km	MPC · JPL
578066	2013 WV_{14}	—	December 20, 2009	Kitt Peak	Spacewatch	·	1.9 km	MPC · JPL
578067	2013 WD_{15}	—	December 28, 2002	Kitt Peak	Spacewatch	MAS	570 m	MPC · JPL
578068	2013 WO_{16}	—	November 12, 2013	Mount Lemmon	Mount Lemmon Survey	·	1.2 km	MPC · JPL
578069	2013 WP_{17}	—	October 14, 2009	Mount Lemmon	Mount Lemmon Survey	V	410 m	MPC · JPL
578070	2013 WY_{17}	—	April 9, 2002	Cerro Tololo	Deep Ecliptic Survey	·	1.9 km	MPC · JPL
578071	2013 WF_{18}	—	November 27, 2013	Haleakala	Pan-STARRS 1	·	1.8 km	MPC · JPL
578072	2013 WZ_{19}	—	November 27, 2013	Haleakala	Pan-STARRS 1	·	1.3 km	MPC · JPL
578073	2013 WQ_{22}	—	November 27, 2013	Haleakala	Pan-STARRS 1	·	1.4 km	MPC · JPL
578074	2013 WX_{22}	—	August 31, 2000	Socorro	LINEAR	EUN	1.3 km	MPC · JPL
578075	2013 WL_{24}	—	November 25, 2013	Haleakala	Pan-STARRS 1	·	1.2 km	MPC · JPL
578076	2013 WO_{24}	—	September 24, 2009	Mount Lemmon	Mount Lemmon Survey	·	2.6 km	MPC · JPL
578077	2013 WT_{25}	—	November 9, 2013	Mount Lemmon	Mount Lemmon Survey	·	1.3 km	MPC · JPL
578078	2013 WW_{25}	—	April 13, 2011	Kitt Peak	Spacewatch	·	1.4 km	MPC · JPL
578079	2013 WB_{26}	—	March 3, 2006	Kitt Peak	Spacewatch	·	1.6 km	MPC · JPL
578080	2013 WD_{26}	—	November 25, 2013	Haleakala	Pan-STARRS 1	·	1.6 km	MPC · JPL
578081	2013 WU_{26}	—	May 8, 2011	Mayhill-ISON	L. Elenin	·	2.6 km	MPC · JPL
578082	2013 WX_{26}	—	September 28, 2008	Catalina	CSS	·	2.6 km	MPC · JPL
578083	2013 WG_{27}	—	October 31, 2013	Piszkéstető	K. Sárneczky	GEF	1.5 km	MPC · JPL
578084	2013 WH_{27}	—	April 16, 2001	Kitt Peak	Spacewatch	GEF	1.3 km	MPC · JPL
578085	2013 WD_{30}	—	November 26, 2013	Mount Lemmon	Mount Lemmon Survey	·	1.2 km	MPC · JPL
578086	2013 WN_{31}	—	November 26, 2013	Haleakala	Pan-STARRS 1	·	1.3 km	MPC · JPL
578087	2013 WF_{33}	—	May 1, 2006	Kitt Peak	Deep Ecliptic Survey	·	1.3 km	MPC · JPL
578088	2013 WW_{34}	—	October 2, 2008	Mount Lemmon	Mount Lemmon Survey	·	2.2 km	MPC · JPL
578089	2013 WW_{37}	—	November 27, 2013	Haleakala	Pan-STARRS 1	·	1.8 km	MPC · JPL
578090	2013 WO_{40}	—	November 28, 2013	Haleakala	Pan-STARRS 1	·	2.1 km	MPC · JPL
578091	2013 WR_{40}	—	November 28, 2013	Mount Lemmon	Mount Lemmon Survey	·	1.4 km	MPC · JPL
578092	2013 WQ_{42}	—	October 26, 2008	Mount Lemmon	Mount Lemmon Survey	·	1.4 km	MPC · JPL
578093	2013 WA_{50}	—	September 10, 2007	Mount Lemmon	Mount Lemmon Survey	·	1.6 km	MPC · JPL
578094	2013 WY_{51}	—	November 25, 2013	Haleakala	Pan-STARRS 1	·	1.3 km	MPC · JPL
578095	2013 WA_{52}	—	February 17, 2001	Haleakala	NEAT	·	2.4 km	MPC · JPL
578096	2013 WC_{55}	—	September 29, 2008	Catalina	CSS	·	2.6 km	MPC · JPL
578097	2013 WS_{55}	—	October 25, 2013	Kitt Peak	Spacewatch	PHO	730 m	MPC · JPL
578098	2013 WQ_{59}	—	October 30, 2013	Haleakala	Pan-STARRS 1	·	1.2 km	MPC · JPL
578099	2013 WE_{60}	—	November 26, 2013	Nogales	M. Schwartz, P. R. Holvorcem	·	1.8 km	MPC · JPL
578100	2013 WR_{60}	—	October 14, 2013	Mount Lemmon	Mount Lemmon Survey	WIT	930 m	MPC · JPL

== 578101–578200 ==
back to top

Designation			Discovery			Properties		Ref
Permanent	Provisional	Named after	Date	Site	Discoverer(s)	Category	Diam.	Ref
578101	2013 WB_{61}	—	October 27, 2013	Catalina	CSS	EUN	1.2 km	MPC · JPL
578102	2013 WZ_{61}	—	November 16, 2009	Mount Lemmon	Mount Lemmon Survey	·	1.5 km	MPC · JPL
578103	2013 WN_{63}	—	July 13, 2013	Haleakala	Pan-STARRS 1	·	1.6 km	MPC · JPL
578104	2013 WO_{65}	—	October 30, 2013	Haleakala	Pan-STARRS 1	·	1.2 km	MPC · JPL
578105	2013 WW_{65}	—	October 26, 2013	Mount Lemmon	Mount Lemmon Survey	GEF	950 m	MPC · JPL
578106	2013 WV_{66}	—	November 28, 2013	Haleakala	Pan-STARRS 1	ADE	2.4 km	MPC · JPL
578107	2013 WO_{67}	—	October 28, 2005	Catalina	CSS	H	450 m	MPC · JPL
578108	2013 WK_{68}	—	November 2, 2013	Mount Lemmon	Mount Lemmon Survey	·	2.9 km	MPC · JPL
578109	2013 WG_{70}	—	January 4, 2001	Haleakala	NEAT	·	1.6 km	MPC · JPL
578110	2013 WX_{71}	—	October 31, 2013	Kitt Peak	Spacewatch	·	1.4 km	MPC · JPL
578111	2013 WR_{76}	—	November 26, 2013	Haleakala	Pan-STARRS 1	ADE	1.7 km	MPC · JPL
578112	2013 WB_{78}	—	November 11, 2013	Kitt Peak	Spacewatch	·	1.5 km	MPC · JPL
578113	2013 WU_{78}	—	March 23, 1995	Kitt Peak	Spacewatch	·	1.4 km	MPC · JPL
578114	2013 WX_{78}	—	October 7, 2013	Mount Lemmon	Mount Lemmon Survey	·	1.7 km	MPC · JPL
578115	2013 WS_{79}	—	November 1, 2013	Kitt Peak	Spacewatch	·	1.6 km	MPC · JPL
578116	2013 WJ_{80}	—	September 25, 2008	Kitt Peak	Spacewatch	·	1.6 km	MPC · JPL
578117	2013 WW_{81}	—	November 27, 2013	Kitt Peak	Spacewatch	·	1.8 km	MPC · JPL
578118	2013 WD_{84}	—	November 27, 2013	Haleakala	Pan-STARRS 1	·	1.9 km	MPC · JPL
578119	2013 WA_{85}	—	May 21, 2012	Haleakala	Pan-STARRS 1	·	1.2 km	MPC · JPL
578120	2013 WX_{86}	—	October 26, 2008	Kitt Peak	Spacewatch	·	1.9 km	MPC · JPL
578121	2013 WM_{87}	—	November 27, 2013	Haleakala	Pan-STARRS 1	EOS	1.7 km	MPC · JPL
578122	2013 WY_{88}	—	September 24, 2008	Kitt Peak	Spacewatch	·	1.5 km	MPC · JPL
578123	2013 WK_{90}	—	October 14, 2013	Mount Lemmon	Mount Lemmon Survey	HNS	960 m	MPC · JPL
578124	2013 WC_{93}	—	September 21, 2008	Mount Lemmon	Mount Lemmon Survey	·	2.1 km	MPC · JPL
578125	2013 WX_{93}	—	November 28, 2013	Mount Lemmon	Mount Lemmon Survey	·	1.5 km	MPC · JPL
578126	2013 WD_{95}	—	November 28, 2013	Mount Lemmon	Mount Lemmon Survey	·	1.2 km	MPC · JPL
578127	2013 WE_{99}	—	October 10, 2012	Mount Lemmon	Mount Lemmon Survey	L5	7.7 km	MPC · JPL
578128	2013 WN_{99}	—	November 6, 2000	La Silla	Barbieri, C.	·	1.4 km	MPC · JPL
578129	2013 WD_{100}	—	October 10, 2004	Kitt Peak	Spacewatch	WIT	930 m	MPC · JPL
578130	2013 WH_{102}	—	October 10, 2008	Mount Lemmon	Mount Lemmon Survey	ADE	2.4 km	MPC · JPL
578131	2013 WR_{102}	—	July 28, 2012	Haleakala	Pan-STARRS 1	·	1.5 km	MPC · JPL
578132	2013 WZ_{102}	—	October 26, 2013	Palomar	Palomar Transient Factory	·	1.6 km	MPC · JPL
578133	2013 WF_{103}	—	November 19, 1996	Kitt Peak	Spacewatch	·	1.2 km	MPC · JPL
578134	2013 WG_{104}	—	October 7, 2004	Socorro	LINEAR	·	1.6 km	MPC · JPL
578135	2013 WJ_{104}	—	September 14, 2004	Palomar	NEAT	MAR	1.3 km	MPC · JPL
578136	2013 WJ_{106}	—	August 7, 2004	Palomar	NEAT	(1547)	1.6 km	MPC · JPL
578137	2013 WO_{108}	—	November 28, 2013	Mount Lemmon	Mount Lemmon Survey	·	2.3 km	MPC · JPL
578138	2013 WZ_{110}	—	November 26, 2013	Haleakala	Pan-STARRS 1	·	1.6 km	MPC · JPL
578139	2013 WE_{111}	—	November 14, 2007	Mount Lemmon	Mount Lemmon Survey	·	2.2 km	MPC · JPL
578140	2013 WJ_{111}	—	January 20, 2009	Catalina	CSS	·	3.3 km	MPC · JPL
578141	2013 WS_{113}	—	August 21, 2004	Siding Spring	SSS	EUN	1.3 km	MPC · JPL
578142	2013 WW_{114}	—	January 29, 2015	Haleakala	Pan-STARRS 1	WIT	790 m	MPC · JPL
578143	2013 WH_{116}	—	November 28, 2013	Haleakala	Pan-STARRS 1	·	1.2 km	MPC · JPL
578144	2013 WK_{116}	—	January 16, 2015	Haleakala	Pan-STARRS 1	EOS	1.5 km	MPC · JPL
578145	2013 WM_{116}	—	February 17, 2015	Haleakala	Pan-STARRS 1	·	1.5 km	MPC · JPL
578146	2013 WP_{116}	—	November 26, 2013	Mount Lemmon	Mount Lemmon Survey	·	1.3 km	MPC · JPL
578147	2013 WQ_{117}	—	November 28, 2013	Mount Lemmon	Mount Lemmon Survey	·	600 m	MPC · JPL
578148	2013 WN_{120}	—	April 16, 2016	Haleakala	Pan-STARRS 1	·	1.3 km	MPC · JPL
578149	2013 WA_{122}	—	November 26, 2013	Mount Lemmon	Mount Lemmon Survey	·	1.3 km	MPC · JPL
578150	2013 WT_{124}	—	February 20, 2015	Haleakala	Pan-STARRS 1	·	1.3 km	MPC · JPL
578151	2013 WQ_{125}	—	November 27, 2013	Haleakala	Pan-STARRS 1	·	1.2 km	MPC · JPL
578152	2013 WU_{125}	—	November 29, 2013	Haleakala	Pan-STARRS 1	·	2.0 km	MPC · JPL
578153	2013 WO_{126}	—	November 26, 2013	Mount Lemmon	Mount Lemmon Survey	AGN	880 m	MPC · JPL
578154	2013 WQ_{126}	—	November 27, 2013	Haleakala	Pan-STARRS 1	·	1.3 km	MPC · JPL
578155	2013 WB_{127}	—	November 24, 2013	Haleakala	Pan-STARRS 1	·	2.3 km	MPC · JPL
578156	2013 WR_{127}	—	November 26, 2013	Haleakala	Pan-STARRS 1	·	1.6 km	MPC · JPL
578157	2013 WU_{127}	—	November 28, 2013	Mount Lemmon	Mount Lemmon Survey	·	1.3 km	MPC · JPL
578158	2013 WW_{128}	—	November 26, 2013	Haleakala	Pan-STARRS 1	·	1.7 km	MPC · JPL
578159	2013 WN_{129}	—	November 27, 2013	Haleakala	Pan-STARRS 1	HNS	1.0 km	MPC · JPL
578160	2013 WH_{132}	—	November 28, 2013	Mount Lemmon	Mount Lemmon Survey	·	630 m	MPC · JPL
578161	2013 WC_{133}	—	November 27, 2013	Haleakala	Pan-STARRS 1	·	1.4 km	MPC · JPL
578162	2013 WR_{134}	—	November 28, 2013	Mount Lemmon	Mount Lemmon Survey	·	2.7 km	MPC · JPL
578163	2013 XC	—	December 11, 2004	Kitt Peak	Spacewatch	·	2.0 km	MPC · JPL
578164 Rerrichbéla	2013 XO	Rerrichbéla	December 1, 2013	Piszkéstető	K. Sárneczky, P. Székely	·	1.4 km	MPC · JPL
578165	2013 XA_{1}	—	November 9, 2013	Mount Lemmon	Mount Lemmon Survey	·	2.1 km	MPC · JPL
578166	2013 XP_{1}	—	December 3, 2013	Haleakala	Pan-STARRS 1	·	1.7 km	MPC · JPL
578167	2013 XO_{2}	—	November 27, 2013	Haleakala	Pan-STARRS 1	·	640 m	MPC · JPL
578168 Miaochangwen	2013 XS_{4}	Miaochangwen	December 1, 2013	XuYi	PMO NEO Survey Program	·	1.4 km	MPC · JPL
578169	2013 XA_{7}	—	July 15, 2004	Siding Spring	SSS	·	1.6 km	MPC · JPL
578170	2013 XK_{8}	—	January 25, 2003	Palomar	NEAT	·	4.7 km	MPC · JPL
578171	2013 XP_{9}	—	December 6, 2013	Nogales	M. Schwartz, P. R. Holvorcem	·	4.0 km	MPC · JPL
578172	2013 XV_{10}	—	November 2, 2013	Mount Lemmon	Mount Lemmon Survey	AGN	1.1 km	MPC · JPL
578173	2013 XU_{11}	—	November 27, 2013	Haleakala	Pan-STARRS 1	·	1.3 km	MPC · JPL
578174	2013 XJ_{17}	—	November 2, 2013	Mount Lemmon	Mount Lemmon Survey	·	1.5 km	MPC · JPL
578175	2013 XK_{17}	—	December 4, 2013	Nogales	M. Schwartz, P. R. Holvorcem	HNS	1.1 km	MPC · JPL
578176	2013 XR_{17}	—	September 21, 2008	Catalina	CSS	·	2.0 km	MPC · JPL
578177	2013 XS_{19}	—	November 7, 2008	Mount Lemmon	Mount Lemmon Survey	·	2.7 km	MPC · JPL
578178	2013 XL_{25}	—	January 5, 2000	Socorro	LINEAR	·	2.0 km	MPC · JPL
578179	2013 XO_{25}	—	September 17, 2003	Kitt Peak	Spacewatch	·	2.5 km	MPC · JPL
578180	2013 XT_{25}	—	May 28, 2000	Socorro	LINEAR	·	2.6 km	MPC · JPL
578181	2013 XO_{26}	—	September 18, 2003	Kitt Peak	Spacewatch	·	1.5 km	MPC · JPL
578182	2013 XS_{26}	—	December 18, 2007	Mount Lemmon	Mount Lemmon Survey	·	2.9 km	MPC · JPL
578183	2013 XA_{27}	—	October 7, 2012	Haleakala	Pan-STARRS 1	·	2.6 km	MPC · JPL
578184	2013 XM_{28}	—	December 10, 2013	Mount Lemmon	Mount Lemmon Survey	·	1.7 km	MPC · JPL
578185	2013 XF_{29}	—	December 7, 2013	Mount Lemmon	Mount Lemmon Survey	HNS	1.1 km	MPC · JPL
578186	2013 XZ_{32}	—	December 11, 2013	Haleakala	Pan-STARRS 1	·	1.6 km	MPC · JPL
578187	2013 XF_{33}	—	December 11, 2013	Haleakala	Pan-STARRS 1	·	1.9 km	MPC · JPL
578188	2013 XN_{34}	—	January 21, 2015	Haleakala	Pan-STARRS 1	HOF	1.9 km	MPC · JPL
578189	2013 XV_{34}	—	December 11, 2013	Haleakala	Pan-STARRS 1	·	2.7 km	MPC · JPL
578190	2013 XC_{35}	—	December 14, 2013	Mount Lemmon	Mount Lemmon Survey	·	2.0 km	MPC · JPL
578191	2013 YA	—	December 6, 2005	Kitt Peak	Spacewatch	·	1.4 km	MPC · JPL
578192	2013 YD_{1}	—	October 3, 2013	Mount Lemmon	Mount Lemmon Survey	·	1.4 km	MPC · JPL
578193	2013 YL_{1}	—	November 27, 2013	Haleakala	Pan-STARRS 1	·	960 m	MPC · JPL
578194	2013 YR_{4}	—	October 26, 2008	Mount Lemmon	Mount Lemmon Survey	·	1.7 km	MPC · JPL
578195	2013 YS_{11}	—	September 24, 2008	Kitt Peak	Spacewatch	(12739)	1.6 km	MPC · JPL
578196	2013 YV_{12}	—	December 25, 2013	Haleakala	Pan-STARRS 1	·	2.2 km	MPC · JPL
578197	2013 YV_{13}	—	December 25, 2013	Mount Lemmon	Mount Lemmon Survey	·	1.8 km	MPC · JPL
578198	2013 YV_{15}	—	December 24, 2013	Mount Lemmon	Mount Lemmon Survey	·	2.0 km	MPC · JPL
578199	2013 YC_{18}	—	September 27, 2008	Mount Lemmon	Mount Lemmon Survey	·	1.2 km	MPC · JPL
578200	2013 YE_{18}	—	March 10, 2002	Kitt Peak	Spacewatch	·	810 m	MPC · JPL

== 578201–578300 ==
back to top

Designation			Discovery			Properties		Ref
Permanent	Provisional	Named after	Date	Site	Discoverer(s)	Category	Diam.	Ref
578201	2013 YN_{18}	—	October 9, 2008	Kitt Peak	Spacewatch	·	1.5 km	MPC · JPL
578202 Philippetalbot	2013 YX_{18}	Philippetalbot	December 25, 2013	Nogales	J.-C. Merlin	·	2.0 km	MPC · JPL
578203	2013 YR_{19}	—	January 25, 2006	Kitt Peak	Spacewatch	(17392)	1.4 km	MPC · JPL
578204	2013 YT_{21}	—	October 31, 2013	Kitt Peak	Spacewatch	HNS	1.0 km	MPC · JPL
578205	2013 YE_{23}	—	October 26, 2013	Mount Lemmon	Mount Lemmon Survey	·	1.9 km	MPC · JPL
578206	2013 YB_{24}	—	November 7, 2013	Kitt Peak	Spacewatch	·	2.9 km	MPC · JPL
578207	2013 YR_{27}	—	December 23, 2013	Mount Lemmon	Mount Lemmon Survey	·	2.3 km	MPC · JPL
578208	2013 YD_{29}	—	December 13, 2013	Mount Lemmon	Mount Lemmon Survey	·	3.4 km	MPC · JPL
578209	2013 YQ_{30}	—	February 15, 2010	Palomar	Palomar Transient Factory	·	2.1 km	MPC · JPL
578210	2013 YS_{30}	—	December 25, 2013	Kitt Peak	Spacewatch	·	1.5 km	MPC · JPL
578211	2013 YU_{31}	—	October 18, 2003	Apache Point	SDSS	·	1.5 km	MPC · JPL
578212	2013 YX_{33}	—	November 8, 2013	Mount Lemmon	Mount Lemmon Survey	EOS	1.8 km	MPC · JPL
578213	2013 YR_{36}	—	March 18, 2010	Kitt Peak	Spacewatch	·	2.4 km	MPC · JPL
578214	2013 YB_{41}	—	May 27, 2011	Kitt Peak	Spacewatch	·	1.9 km	MPC · JPL
578215	2013 YW_{42}	—	October 28, 2013	Mount Lemmon	Mount Lemmon Survey	·	1.7 km	MPC · JPL
578216	2013 YL_{47}	—	October 7, 2008	Mount Lemmon	Mount Lemmon Survey	·	1.8 km	MPC · JPL
578217	2013 YN_{51}	—	October 23, 2013	Haleakala	Pan-STARRS 1	EUN	1.1 km	MPC · JPL
578218	2013 YU_{52}	—	November 27, 2013	Haleakala	Pan-STARRS 1	·	1.2 km	MPC · JPL
578219	2013 YW_{52}	—	November 27, 2013	Haleakala	Pan-STARRS 1	·	1.2 km	MPC · JPL
578220	2013 YQ_{53}	—	January 6, 2010	Kitt Peak	Spacewatch	NEM	2.0 km	MPC · JPL
578221	2013 YR_{54}	—	November 28, 2013	Mount Lemmon	Mount Lemmon Survey	·	1.7 km	MPC · JPL
578222	2013 YU_{56}	—	December 4, 2013	Haleakala	Pan-STARRS 1	·	2.4 km	MPC · JPL
578223	2013 YS_{57}	—	October 7, 2008	Mount Lemmon	Mount Lemmon Survey	·	1.6 km	MPC · JPL
578224	2013 YT_{57}	—	April 11, 2010	Mount Lemmon	Mount Lemmon Survey	·	1.7 km	MPC · JPL
578225	2013 YC_{59}	—	October 26, 2008	Catalina	CSS	JUN	900 m	MPC · JPL
578226	2013 YU_{59}	—	January 23, 2006	Kitt Peak	Spacewatch	·	1.1 km	MPC · JPL
578227	2013 YC_{60}	—	November 8, 2007	Kitt Peak	Spacewatch	·	2.5 km	MPC · JPL
578228	2013 YF_{60}	—	April 15, 2010	WISE	WISE	·	1.1 km	MPC · JPL
578229	2013 YQ_{61}	—	December 1, 2013	XuYi	PMO NEO Survey Program	JUN	1.2 km	MPC · JPL
578230	2013 YC_{62}	—	August 29, 2009	Kitt Peak	Spacewatch	·	610 m	MPC · JPL
578231	2013 YQ_{62}	—	September 18, 2012	Mount Lemmon	Mount Lemmon Survey	AGN	1.1 km	MPC · JPL
578232	2013 YQ_{63}	—	December 27, 2013	Kitt Peak	Spacewatch	·	2.3 km	MPC · JPL
578233	2013 YH_{64}	—	December 27, 2013	Piszkéstető	K. Sárneczky	·	2.6 km	MPC · JPL
578234	2013 YG_{65}	—	September 17, 2012	Mount Lemmon	Mount Lemmon Survey	KOR	1.2 km	MPC · JPL
578235	2013 YR_{66}	—	November 26, 2013	Mount Lemmon	Mount Lemmon Survey	NEM	2.1 km	MPC · JPL
578236	2013 YE_{67}	—	December 30, 2013	Mount Lemmon	Mount Lemmon Survey	·	1.6 km	MPC · JPL
578237	2013 YP_{68}	—	December 30, 2013	Mount Lemmon	Mount Lemmon Survey	·	1.5 km	MPC · JPL
578238	2013 YR_{68}	—	December 30, 2013	Mount Lemmon	Mount Lemmon Survey	·	890 m	MPC · JPL
578239	2013 YP_{70}	—	October 5, 2013	Kitt Peak	Spacewatch	·	1.3 km	MPC · JPL
578240	2013 YK_{71}	—	November 27, 2013	Haleakala	Pan-STARRS 1	·	1.7 km	MPC · JPL
578241	2013 YC_{72}	—	February 24, 2006	Catalina	CSS	·	2.5 km	MPC · JPL
578242	2013 YJ_{72}	—	November 28, 2013	Mount Lemmon	Mount Lemmon Survey	·	2.0 km	MPC · JPL
578243	2013 YS_{73}	—	November 9, 2009	Catalina	CSS	NYS	830 m	MPC · JPL
578244	2013 YA_{75}	—	October 20, 2003	Palomar	NEAT	·	2.6 km	MPC · JPL
578245	2013 YL_{75}	—	October 20, 2012	Mount Lemmon	Mount Lemmon Survey	MAR	960 m	MPC · JPL
578246	2013 YW_{77}	—	October 11, 2012	Piszkéstető	K. Sárneczky	·	3.6 km	MPC · JPL
578247	2013 YE_{79}	—	October 10, 2012	Mount Lemmon	Mount Lemmon Survey	·	2.1 km	MPC · JPL
578248	2013 YN_{80}	—	December 28, 2013	Kitt Peak	Spacewatch	EOS	1.4 km	MPC · JPL
578249 Josephcarr	2013 YY_{81}	Josephcarr	March 16, 2004	Mauna Kea	D. D. Balam	EOS	1.5 km	MPC · JPL
578250	2013 YZ_{81}	—	December 28, 2013	Kitt Peak	Spacewatch	AST	1.6 km	MPC · JPL
578251	2013 YD_{85}	—	December 28, 2013	Kitt Peak	Spacewatch	·	1.7 km	MPC · JPL
578252	2013 YR_{86}	—	December 28, 2013	Kitt Peak	Spacewatch	(43176)	3.3 km	MPC · JPL
578253	2013 YA_{87}	—	December 28, 2013	Kitt Peak	Spacewatch	·	1.8 km	MPC · JPL
578254	2013 YP_{88}	—	November 24, 2008	Mount Lemmon	Mount Lemmon Survey	·	2.1 km	MPC · JPL
578255	2013 YL_{90}	—	July 21, 2006	Mount Lemmon	Mount Lemmon Survey	EOS	2.5 km	MPC · JPL
578256	2013 YO_{91}	—	February 7, 2011	Mount Lemmon	Mount Lemmon Survey	·	650 m	MPC · JPL
578257	2013 YX_{95}	—	October 19, 2012	Mount Lemmon	Mount Lemmon Survey	EOS	2.2 km	MPC · JPL
578258	2013 YY_{96}	—	December 30, 2013	Haleakala	Pan-STARRS 1	PHO	760 m	MPC · JPL
578259	2013 YM_{100}	—	December 31, 2013	Mount Lemmon	Mount Lemmon Survey	BRA	1.5 km	MPC · JPL
578260	2013 YH_{101}	—	September 21, 2003	Kitt Peak	Spacewatch	·	1.6 km	MPC · JPL
578261	2013 YP_{101}	—	September 8, 2012	Bergisch Gladbach	W. Bickel	·	2.0 km	MPC · JPL
578262	2013 YO_{103}	—	December 27, 2013	Mount Lemmon	Mount Lemmon Survey	·	2.4 km	MPC · JPL
578263	2013 YT_{103}	—	August 15, 2009	Kitt Peak	Spacewatch	·	1.0 km	MPC · JPL
578264	2013 YF_{104}	—	December 19, 2009	Mount Lemmon	Mount Lemmon Survey	·	1.7 km	MPC · JPL
578265	2013 YB_{106}	—	December 11, 2013	Haleakala	Pan-STARRS 1	·	1.4 km	MPC · JPL
578266	2013 YT_{106}	—	November 24, 2008	Kitt Peak	Spacewatch	KOR	1.3 km	MPC · JPL
578267	2013 YN_{110}	—	December 27, 2013	Kitt Peak	Spacewatch	EOS	1.6 km	MPC · JPL
578268	2013 YM_{111}	—	December 29, 2013	Haleakala	Pan-STARRS 1	(1547)	1.5 km	MPC · JPL
578269	2013 YR_{115}	—	March 17, 2004	Kitt Peak	Spacewatch	·	1.9 km	MPC · JPL
578270	2013 YL_{116}	—	September 19, 1998	Apache Point	SDSS	·	2.5 km	MPC · JPL
578271	2013 YZ_{116}	—	December 30, 2013	Mount Lemmon	Mount Lemmon Survey	·	3.4 km	MPC · JPL
578272	2013 YB_{118}	—	October 1, 2003	Kitt Peak	Spacewatch	·	2.1 km	MPC · JPL
578273	2013 YR_{120}	—	December 30, 2013	Haleakala	Pan-STARRS 1	·	1.7 km	MPC · JPL
578274	2013 YY_{126}	—	December 31, 2013	Mount Lemmon	Mount Lemmon Survey	·	2.4 km	MPC · JPL
578275	2013 YJ_{128}	—	September 14, 2007	Kitt Peak	Spacewatch	KOR	1.3 km	MPC · JPL
578276	2013 YT_{134}	—	October 28, 2008	Kitt Peak	Spacewatch	·	1.4 km	MPC · JPL
578277	2013 YW_{135}	—	September 21, 2012	Mount Lemmon	Mount Lemmon Survey	·	2.0 km	MPC · JPL
578278	2013 YY_{136}	—	August 14, 2012	Siding Spring	SSS	·	2.0 km	MPC · JPL
578279	2013 YS_{143}	—	April 24, 2007	Mount Lemmon	Mount Lemmon Survey	·	1.7 km	MPC · JPL
578280	2013 YK_{145}	—	December 30, 2013	Mount Lemmon	Mount Lemmon Survey	·	1.3 km	MPC · JPL
578281	2013 YR_{150}	—	December 11, 2013	Haleakala	Pan-STARRS 1	·	1.3 km	MPC · JPL
578282	2013 YT_{152}	—	September 20, 2011	Haleakala	Pan-STARRS 1	VER	2.8 km	MPC · JPL
578283	2013 YU_{152}	—	December 31, 2013	Haleakala	Pan-STARRS 1	·	2.7 km	MPC · JPL
578284	2013 YG_{153}	—	October 22, 2003	Kitt Peak	Spacewatch	·	1.8 km	MPC · JPL
578285	2013 YQ_{154}	—	December 31, 2013	Kitt Peak	Spacewatch	·	1.7 km	MPC · JPL
578286	2013 YQ_{155}	—	May 22, 2015	Haleakala	Pan-STARRS 1	EUN	950 m	MPC · JPL
578287	2013 YX_{155}	—	January 16, 2015	Haleakala	Pan-STARRS 1	EOS	2.3 km	MPC · JPL
578288	2013 YZ_{155}	—	May 1, 2016	Haleakala	Pan-STARRS 1	JUN	1.1 km	MPC · JPL
578289	2013 YC_{156}	—	December 23, 2013	Mount Lemmon	Mount Lemmon Survey	·	1.4 km	MPC · JPL
578290	2013 YS_{158}	—	October 11, 2017	Catalina	CSS	·	2.8 km	MPC · JPL
578291	2013 YF_{161}	—	January 23, 2015	Haleakala	Pan-STARRS 1	·	2.0 km	MPC · JPL
578292	2013 YX_{161}	—	December 31, 2013	Haleakala	Pan-STARRS 1	·	1.9 km	MPC · JPL
578293	2013 YJ_{162}	—	December 31, 2013	Haleakala	Pan-STARRS 1	·	1.4 km	MPC · JPL
578294	2013 YV_{162}	—	December 25, 2013	Mount Lemmon	Mount Lemmon Survey	·	2.3 km	MPC · JPL
578295	2013 YJ_{163}	—	December 26, 2013	Mount Lemmon	Mount Lemmon Survey	·	1.4 km	MPC · JPL
578296	2013 YM_{163}	—	December 25, 2013	Mount Lemmon	Mount Lemmon Survey	·	1.5 km	MPC · JPL
578297	2014 AP	—	August 20, 2006	Palomar	NEAT	·	2.1 km	MPC · JPL
578298	2014 AM_{3}	—	January 1, 2014	Haleakala	Pan-STARRS 1	·	1.7 km	MPC · JPL
578299	2014 AJ_{5}	—	August 20, 2003	Campo Imperatore	CINEOS	·	1.9 km	MPC · JPL
578300	2014 AL_{5}	—	November 18, 2008	Kitt Peak	Spacewatch	KOR	1.4 km	MPC · JPL

== 578301–578400 ==
back to top

Designation			Discovery			Properties		Ref
Permanent	Provisional	Named after	Date	Site	Discoverer(s)	Category	Diam.	Ref
578301	2014 AM_{6}	—	January 1, 2014	Haleakala	Pan-STARRS 1	·	670 m	MPC · JPL
578302	2014 AO_{6}	—	September 12, 2001	Kitt Peak	Deep Ecliptic Survey	·	1.9 km	MPC · JPL
578303	2014 AP_{8}	—	February 21, 2009	Mount Lemmon	Mount Lemmon Survey	·	1.7 km	MPC · JPL
578304	2014 AW_{8}	—	October 18, 2012	Haleakala	Pan-STARRS 1	·	2.0 km	MPC · JPL
578305	2014 AM_{9}	—	September 24, 2008	Mount Lemmon	Mount Lemmon Survey	WIT	940 m	MPC · JPL
578306	2014 AF_{11}	—	December 31, 2008	Mount Lemmon	Mount Lemmon Survey	·	1.8 km	MPC · JPL
578307	2014 AV_{12}	—	February 24, 2003	Haleakala	NEAT	·	3.3 km	MPC · JPL
578308	2014 AG_{13}	—	October 21, 2008	Mount Lemmon	Mount Lemmon Survey	·	2.1 km	MPC · JPL
578309	2014 AK_{13}	—	September 18, 2012	Mount Lemmon	Mount Lemmon Survey	KOR	1.1 km	MPC · JPL
578310	2014 AS_{13}	—	January 1, 2014	Mount Lemmon	Mount Lemmon Survey	·	1.7 km	MPC · JPL
578311	2014 AL_{15}	—	January 3, 2014	Mount Lemmon	Mount Lemmon Survey	·	1.5 km	MPC · JPL
578312	2014 AF_{17}	—	October 23, 2008	Mount Lemmon	Mount Lemmon Survey	·	1.7 km	MPC · JPL
578313	2014 AW_{21}	—	January 3, 2014	Kitt Peak	Spacewatch	·	1.2 km	MPC · JPL
578314	2014 AC_{23}	—	January 3, 2014	Kitt Peak	Spacewatch	VER	2.9 km	MPC · JPL
578315	2014 AM_{23}	—	January 3, 2014	Mount Lemmon	Mount Lemmon Survey	·	1.9 km	MPC · JPL
578316	2014 AP_{23}	—	January 20, 2009	Kitt Peak	Spacewatch	·	1.5 km	MPC · JPL
578317	2014 AA_{25}	—	December 4, 2007	Mount Lemmon	Mount Lemmon Survey	·	3.2 km	MPC · JPL
578318	2014 AN_{28}	—	February 9, 2003	Kitt Peak	Spacewatch	·	3.4 km	MPC · JPL
578319	2014 AU_{31}	—	August 2, 2011	Haleakala	Pan-STARRS 1	·	4.0 km	MPC · JPL
578320	2014 AP_{32}	—	January 7, 2014	Haleakala	Pan-STARRS 1	H	550 m	MPC · JPL
578321	2014 AD_{34}	—	November 20, 2008	Kitt Peak	Spacewatch	·	1.6 km	MPC · JPL
578322	2014 AN_{34}	—	January 2, 2014	Mount Lemmon	Mount Lemmon Survey	·	1.4 km	MPC · JPL
578323	2014 AP_{35}	—	January 2, 2014	Mount Lemmon	Mount Lemmon Survey	HOF	2.0 km	MPC · JPL
578324	2014 AW_{37}	—	September 20, 2003	Kitt Peak	Spacewatch	(18466)	2.3 km	MPC · JPL
578325	2014 AC_{38}	—	January 20, 2009	Kitt Peak	Spacewatch	·	1.4 km	MPC · JPL
578326	2014 AX_{41}	—	February 16, 2010	Mount Lemmon	Mount Lemmon Survey	·	1.0 km	MPC · JPL
578327	2014 AD_{43}	—	November 28, 2013	Kitt Peak	Spacewatch	·	2.0 km	MPC · JPL
578328	2014 AQ_{43}	—	December 31, 2013	Mount Lemmon	Mount Lemmon Survey	·	1.3 km	MPC · JPL
578329	2014 AX_{45}	—	December 13, 2013	Mount Lemmon	Mount Lemmon Survey	·	3.1 km	MPC · JPL
578330	2014 AJ_{48}	—	January 7, 2014	Kitt Peak	Spacewatch	·	1.6 km	MPC · JPL
578331	2014 AJ_{49}	—	December 28, 2013	Kitt Peak	Spacewatch	·	1.9 km	MPC · JPL
578332	2014 AT_{49}	—	October 10, 2012	Haleakala	Pan-STARRS 1	·	3.1 km	MPC · JPL
578333	2014 AO_{52}	—	August 28, 2006	Kitt Peak	Spacewatch	·	1.9 km	MPC · JPL
578334	2014 AX_{54}	—	April 18, 2009	Mount Lemmon	Mount Lemmon Survey	·	2.7 km	MPC · JPL
578335	2014 AV_{57}	—	November 28, 2013	Mount Lemmon	Mount Lemmon Survey	·	1.8 km	MPC · JPL
578336	2014 AB_{58}	—	January 4, 2014	Haleakala	Pan-STARRS 1	BRA	1.5 km	MPC · JPL
578337	2014 AV_{58}	—	January 1, 2014	Nogales	M. Schwartz, P. R. Holvorcem	·	1.9 km	MPC · JPL
578338	2014 AR_{59}	—	March 23, 2003	Palomar	NEAT	·	3.5 km	MPC · JPL
578339	2014 AT_{61}	—	October 20, 2003	Kitt Peak	Spacewatch	DOR	2.0 km	MPC · JPL
578340	2014 AO_{66}	—	January 10, 2014	Kitt Peak	Spacewatch	·	1.2 km	MPC · JPL
578341	2014 AN_{68}	—	January 3, 2014	Mount Lemmon	Mount Lemmon Survey	·	2.1 km	MPC · JPL
578342	2014 AF_{69}	—	January 9, 2014	Haleakala	Pan-STARRS 1	·	2.8 km	MPC · JPL
578343	2014 AS_{70}	—	January 3, 2014	Kitt Peak	Spacewatch	·	2.5 km	MPC · JPL
578344	2014 BF_{1}	—	December 22, 2008	Kitt Peak	Spacewatch	·	1.5 km	MPC · JPL
578345	2014 BL_{1}	—	March 12, 2005	Kitt Peak	Deep Ecliptic Survey	KOR	1.6 km	MPC · JPL
578346	2014 BN_{2}	—	December 27, 2013	Kitt Peak	Spacewatch	·	2.7 km	MPC · JPL
578347	2014 BG_{5}	—	September 25, 2012	Mount Lemmon	Mount Lemmon Survey	HOF	2.1 km	MPC · JPL
578348	2014 BH_{5}	—	January 20, 2009	Kitt Peak	Spacewatch	·	1.6 km	MPC · JPL
578349	2014 BW_{5}	—	February 28, 2009	Saint-Sulpice	B. Christophe	·	1.9 km	MPC · JPL
578350	2014 BY_{7}	—	December 30, 2013	Mount Lemmon	Mount Lemmon Survey	·	2.4 km	MPC · JPL
578351	2014 BY_{8}	—	January 5, 2006	Mount Lemmon	Mount Lemmon Survey	HNS	1.6 km	MPC · JPL
578352	2014 BS_{9}	—	December 21, 2004	Catalina	CSS	·	1.7 km	MPC · JPL
578353	2014 BF_{13}	—	January 3, 2014	Kitt Peak	Spacewatch	BRA	1.3 km	MPC · JPL
578354	2014 BA_{14}	—	October 7, 2008	Mount Lemmon	Mount Lemmon Survey	·	1.7 km	MPC · JPL
578355	2014 BW_{17}	—	October 8, 2012	Kitt Peak	Spacewatch	·	2.6 km	MPC · JPL
578356	2014 BF_{18}	—	November 21, 2001	Apache Point	SDSS Collaboration	·	2.5 km	MPC · JPL
578357	2014 BY_{19}	—	December 30, 2013	Mount Lemmon	Mount Lemmon Survey	·	1.7 km	MPC · JPL
578358	2014 BT_{24}	—	January 24, 2014	Haleakala	Pan-STARRS 1	BRA	1.1 km	MPC · JPL
578359	2014 BS_{25}	—	September 16, 2003	Kitt Peak	Spacewatch	·	1.0 km	MPC · JPL
578360	2014 BC_{30}	—	September 14, 2006	Kitt Peak	Spacewatch	·	2.9 km	MPC · JPL
578361	2014 BN_{33}	—	January 7, 2014	Catalina	CSS	·	1.5 km	MPC · JPL
578362	2014 BW_{34}	—	January 7, 2014	Mount Lemmon	Mount Lemmon Survey	TIR	2.5 km	MPC · JPL
578363	2014 BG_{36}	—	February 1, 2009	Kitt Peak	Spacewatch	·	1.3 km	MPC · JPL
578364	2014 BD_{39}	—	March 26, 2001	Kitt Peak	Spacewatch	·	1.2 km	MPC · JPL
578365	2014 BM_{41}	—	March 1, 2009	Kitt Peak	Spacewatch	·	2.1 km	MPC · JPL
578366	2014 BZ_{41}	—	May 13, 2009	Kitt Peak	Spacewatch	·	2.3 km	MPC · JPL
578367	2014 BP_{45}	—	January 23, 2014	Mount Lemmon	Mount Lemmon Survey	VER	2.7 km	MPC · JPL
578368	2014 BX_{47}	—	January 23, 2014	Mount Lemmon	Mount Lemmon Survey	L4	7.9 km	MPC · JPL
578369	2014 BV_{48}	—	March 10, 2005	Mount Lemmon	Mount Lemmon Survey	·	1.5 km	MPC · JPL
578370	2014 BC_{49}	—	January 3, 2014	Mayhill-ISON	L. Elenin	·	2.6 km	MPC · JPL
578371	2014 BV_{49}	—	March 10, 2005	Mount Lemmon	Mount Lemmon Survey	KOR	1.5 km	MPC · JPL
578372	2014 BA_{51}	—	October 10, 2008	Mount Lemmon	Mount Lemmon Survey	·	1.6 km	MPC · JPL
578373	2014 BM_{52}	—	December 25, 2013	Kitt Peak	Spacewatch	·	1.0 km	MPC · JPL
578374	2014 BK_{53}	—	January 24, 2014	Haleakala	Pan-STARRS 1	EOS	1.9 km	MPC · JPL
578375	2014 BM_{53}	—	January 1, 2014	Haleakala	Pan-STARRS 1	·	2.0 km	MPC · JPL
578376	2014 BN_{53}	—	January 24, 2014	Haleakala	Pan-STARRS 1	·	2.7 km	MPC · JPL
578377	2014 BM_{54}	—	January 29, 2009	Kitt Peak	Spacewatch	·	1.3 km	MPC · JPL
578378	2014 BO_{54}	—	November 30, 2008	Kitt Peak	Spacewatch	AGN	1.0 km	MPC · JPL
578379	2014 BP_{56}	—	February 1, 2003	Palomar	NEAT	·	3.5 km	MPC · JPL
578380	2014 BC_{59}	—	February 3, 2003	Palomar	NEAT	·	2.7 km	MPC · JPL
578381	2014 BF_{59}	—	December 30, 2008	Kitt Peak	Spacewatch	·	1.6 km	MPC · JPL
578382	2014 BR_{61}	—	January 28, 2014	Kitt Peak	Spacewatch	·	1.5 km	MPC · JPL
578383	2014 BG_{64}	—	October 26, 2008	Mount Lemmon	Mount Lemmon Survey	·	1.7 km	MPC · JPL
578384	2014 BZ_{64}	—	January 28, 2014	Mount Lemmon	Mount Lemmon Survey	H	350 m	MPC · JPL
578385	2014 BR_{66}	—	March 1, 2009	Mount Lemmon	Mount Lemmon Survey	·	2.1 km	MPC · JPL
578386	2014 BG_{69}	—	January 1, 2014	Mount Lemmon	Mount Lemmon Survey	·	2.4 km	MPC · JPL
578387	2014 BB_{70}	—	August 18, 2012	ESA OGS	ESA OGS	·	3.0 km	MPC · JPL
578388	2014 BG_{70}	—	November 28, 2014	Mount Lemmon	Mount Lemmon Survey	HNS	1.2 km	MPC · JPL
578389	2014 BG_{71}	—	January 25, 2014	Haleakala	Pan-STARRS 1	·	2.4 km	MPC · JPL
578390	2014 BN_{71}	—	March 29, 2015	Haleakala	Pan-STARRS 1	·	1.6 km	MPC · JPL
578391	2014 BK_{73}	—	January 21, 2014	Mount Lemmon	Mount Lemmon Survey	·	1.0 km	MPC · JPL
578392	2014 BD_{74}	—	December 30, 2013	Mount Lemmon	Mount Lemmon Survey	·	1.1 km	MPC · JPL
578393	2014 BH_{74}	—	January 28, 2014	Mount Lemmon	Mount Lemmon Survey	·	2.1 km	MPC · JPL
578394	2014 BT_{74}	—	January 25, 2014	Haleakala	Pan-STARRS 1	THB	2.3 km	MPC · JPL
578395	2014 BV_{75}	—	July 5, 2016	Haleakala	Pan-STARRS 1	·	1.4 km	MPC · JPL
578396	2014 BL_{76}	—	January 26, 2014	Haleakala	Pan-STARRS 1	·	2.4 km	MPC · JPL
578397	2014 BL_{77}	—	January 23, 2014	Mount Lemmon	Mount Lemmon Survey	·	2.7 km	MPC · JPL
578398	2014 BS_{77}	—	January 26, 2014	Haleakala	Pan-STARRS 1	·	2.2 km	MPC · JPL
578399	2014 BX_{78}	—	January 31, 2014	Haleakala	Pan-STARRS 1	·	3.1 km	MPC · JPL
578400	2014 BM_{79}	—	January 31, 2014	Haleakala	Pan-STARRS 1	·	2.8 km	MPC · JPL

== 578401–578500 ==
back to top

Designation			Discovery			Properties		Ref
Permanent	Provisional	Named after	Date	Site	Discoverer(s)	Category	Diam.	Ref
578401	2014 BO_{80}	—	January 29, 2014	Kitt Peak	Spacewatch	·	2.4 km	MPC · JPL
578402	2014 BW_{80}	—	January 24, 2014	Haleakala	Pan-STARRS 1	·	930 m	MPC · JPL
578403	2014 CK_{3}	—	January 7, 2014	Kitt Peak	Spacewatch	THM	1.7 km	MPC · JPL
578404	2014 CT_{6}	—	January 23, 2014	Kitt Peak	Spacewatch	TIR	2.0 km	MPC · JPL
578405	2014 CL_{8}	—	February 6, 2014	Catalina	CSS	·	2.2 km	MPC · JPL
578406	2014 CZ_{8}	—	November 24, 2009	Kitt Peak	Spacewatch	MAS	480 m	MPC · JPL
578407	2014 CY_{10}	—	January 2, 2014	Kitt Peak	Spacewatch	·	1.0 km	MPC · JPL
578408	2014 CZ_{12}	—	December 11, 2013	Mount Lemmon	Mount Lemmon Survey	·	2.2 km	MPC · JPL
578409	2014 CZ_{15}	—	March 11, 2003	Palomar	NEAT	·	3.2 km	MPC · JPL
578410	2014 CL_{17}	—	January 9, 2014	Mount Lemmon	Mount Lemmon Survey	·	2.3 km	MPC · JPL
578411	2014 CF_{19}	—	September 19, 2009	Kitt Peak	Spacewatch	L4	10 km	MPC · JPL
578412	2014 CU_{19}	—	November 28, 2013	Mount Lemmon	Mount Lemmon Survey	·	3.0 km	MPC · JPL
578413	2014 CW_{24}	—	February 10, 2014	Haleakala	Pan-STARRS 1	·	2.4 km	MPC · JPL
578414	2014 CX_{24}	—	February 3, 2009	Mount Lemmon	Mount Lemmon Survey	GEF	1.3 km	MPC · JPL
578415	2014 CE_{26}	—	January 29, 2014	Kitt Peak	Spacewatch	·	2.3 km	MPC · JPL
578416	2014 CX_{27}	—	July 11, 2016	Haleakala	Pan-STARRS 1	·	1.1 km	MPC · JPL
578417	2014 CA_{28}	—	June 13, 2015	Mount Lemmon	Mount Lemmon Survey	·	2.6 km	MPC · JPL
578418	2014 CM_{28}	—	February 9, 2014	Haleakala	Pan-STARRS 1	·	2.7 km	MPC · JPL
578419	2014 CB_{31}	—	February 10, 2014	Haleakala	Pan-STARRS 1	·	2.5 km	MPC · JPL
578420	2014 CE_{31}	—	February 11, 2014	Mount Lemmon	Mount Lemmon Survey	·	2.6 km	MPC · JPL
578421	2014 CK_{31}	—	February 9, 2014	Mount Lemmon	Mount Lemmon Survey	·	2.3 km	MPC · JPL
578422	2014 CN_{31}	—	February 5, 2014	Mount Lemmon	Mount Lemmon Survey	·	2.1 km	MPC · JPL
578423	2014 CS_{31}	—	February 10, 2014	Haleakala	Pan-STARRS 1	·	2.4 km	MPC · JPL
578424	2014 CF_{32}	—	February 8, 2014	Mount Lemmon	Mount Lemmon Survey	TRE	1.9 km	MPC · JPL
578425	2014 DN	—	January 5, 2006	Catalina	CSS	H	500 m	MPC · JPL
578426	2014 DJ_{1}	—	April 1, 2011	Mount Lemmon	Mount Lemmon Survey	·	520 m	MPC · JPL
578427	2014 DS_{1}	—	August 8, 2005	Cerro Tololo	Deep Ecliptic Survey	EOS	1.9 km	MPC · JPL
578428	2014 DF_{2}	—	July 28, 2005	Palomar	NEAT	EOS	2.7 km	MPC · JPL
578429	2014 DH_{4}	—	August 26, 2011	Piszkéstető	K. Sárneczky	EOS	1.8 km	MPC · JPL
578430	2014 DB_{5}	—	October 10, 2007	Mount Lemmon	Mount Lemmon Survey	KOR	1.4 km	MPC · JPL
578431	2014 DN_{5}	—	July 19, 2006	Mauna Kea	P. A. Wiegert, D. Subasinghe	·	1.7 km	MPC · JPL
578432	2014 DH_{8}	—	February 9, 2003	Palomar	NEAT	·	3.8 km	MPC · JPL
578433	2014 DQ_{9}	—	August 27, 2006	Kitt Peak	Spacewatch	EOS	2.0 km	MPC · JPL
578434	2014 DY_{10}	—	December 15, 2007	Mount Lemmon	Mount Lemmon Survey	THB	2.7 km	MPC · JPL
578435	2014 DN_{11}	—	December 6, 2012	Mount Lemmon	Mount Lemmon Survey	·	3.6 km	MPC · JPL
578436	2014 DW_{11}	—	February 19, 2014	Mount Lemmon	Mount Lemmon Survey	·	2.8 km	MPC · JPL
578437	2014 DB_{12}	—	February 19, 2014	Mount Lemmon	Mount Lemmon Survey	·	3.2 km	MPC · JPL
578438	2014 DR_{12}	—	February 9, 2014	Haleakala	Pan-STARRS 1	NYS	790 m	MPC · JPL
578439	2014 DK_{14}	—	February 20, 2014	Haleakala	Pan-STARRS 1	EUP	2.8 km	MPC · JPL
578440	2014 DE_{15}	—	October 21, 2007	Mount Lemmon	Mount Lemmon Survey	·	2.8 km	MPC · JPL
578441	2014 DY_{23}	—	January 4, 2001	Kitt Peak	Spacewatch	L4	9.7 km	MPC · JPL
578442	2014 DH_{24}	—	February 17, 2010	Kitt Peak	Spacewatch	·	1.5 km	MPC · JPL
578443	2014 DR_{24}	—	September 21, 2001	Apache Point	SDSS Collaboration	EOS	2.0 km	MPC · JPL
578444	2014 DD_{25}	—	February 20, 2014	Mount Lemmon	Mount Lemmon Survey	EOS	1.7 km	MPC · JPL
578445	2014 DH_{25}	—	January 29, 2009	Kitt Peak	Spacewatch	·	1.4 km	MPC · JPL
578446	2014 DP_{25}	—	September 27, 2003	Kitt Peak	Spacewatch	(17392)	1.5 km	MPC · JPL
578447	2014 DK_{26}	—	February 20, 2014	Mount Lemmon	Mount Lemmon Survey	·	2.2 km	MPC · JPL
578448	2014 DY_{26}	—	February 20, 2014	Mount Lemmon	Mount Lemmon Survey	EOS	1.6 km	MPC · JPL
578449	2014 DJ_{27}	—	February 6, 2014	Mount Lemmon	Mount Lemmon Survey	·	1.4 km	MPC · JPL
578450	2014 DL_{29}	—	January 10, 2014	Mount Lemmon	Mount Lemmon Survey	·	2.3 km	MPC · JPL
578451	2014 DH_{30}	—	February 28, 2009	Kitt Peak	Spacewatch	·	1.8 km	MPC · JPL
578452	2014 DU_{30}	—	February 9, 2003	Palomar	NEAT	EOS	2.4 km	MPC · JPL
578453	2014 DJ_{32}	—	April 22, 2009	Kitt Peak	Spacewatch	·	2.4 km	MPC · JPL
578454	2014 DZ_{32}	—	March 17, 2009	Bergisch Gladbach	W. Bickel	·	1.8 km	MPC · JPL
578455	2014 DC_{34}	—	February 1, 2014	Wildberg	R. Apitzsch	·	1.3 km	MPC · JPL
578456	2014 DS_{34}	—	September 26, 2011	Haleakala	Pan-STARRS 1	(1298)	2.2 km	MPC · JPL
578457	2014 DN_{35}	—	March 11, 2003	Palomar	NEAT	·	3.2 km	MPC · JPL
578458	2014 DU_{35}	—	November 12, 2001	Apache Point	SDSS Collaboration	·	2.6 km	MPC · JPL
578459	2014 DB_{37}	—	September 26, 2006	Kitt Peak	Spacewatch	EOS	1.9 km	MPC · JPL
578460	2014 DC_{38}	—	January 23, 2014	Mount Lemmon	Mount Lemmon Survey	·	2.3 km	MPC · JPL
578461	2014 DW_{39}	—	February 14, 2004	Kitt Peak	Spacewatch	·	2.4 km	MPC · JPL
578462	2014 DC_{40}	—	January 25, 2009	Kitt Peak	Spacewatch	H	380 m	MPC · JPL
578463	2014 DK_{41}	—	February 26, 2009	Kitt Peak	Spacewatch	·	1.5 km	MPC · JPL
578464	2014 DM_{41}	—	February 24, 2014	Haleakala	Pan-STARRS 1	HNS	890 m	MPC · JPL
578465	2014 DQ_{47}	—	October 9, 2012	Mount Lemmon	Mount Lemmon Survey	·	830 m	MPC · JPL
578466	2014 DY_{47}	—	February 27, 2014	Kitt Peak	Spacewatch	·	580 m	MPC · JPL
578467	2014 DW_{48}	—	July 30, 2005	Palomar	NEAT	EOS	1.8 km	MPC · JPL
578468	2014 DQ_{49}	—	February 26, 2014	Haleakala	Pan-STARRS 1	·	2.2 km	MPC · JPL
578469	2014 DU_{51}	—	October 5, 2000	Kitt Peak	Spacewatch	EOS	2.1 km	MPC · JPL
578470	2014 DD_{52}	—	February 10, 2014	Haleakala	Pan-STARRS 1	·	2.3 km	MPC · JPL
578471	2014 DR_{52}	—	February 26, 2014	Haleakala	Pan-STARRS 1	·	2.1 km	MPC · JPL
578472	2014 DE_{53}	—	August 19, 2001	Cerro Tololo	Deep Ecliptic Survey	·	2.2 km	MPC · JPL
578473	2014 DS_{56}	—	January 13, 2008	Mount Lemmon	Mount Lemmon Survey	·	1.8 km	MPC · JPL
578474	2014 DE_{57}	—	March 26, 2003	Palomar	NEAT	·	3.6 km	MPC · JPL
578475	2014 DD_{58}	—	October 3, 2006	Kitt Peak	Spacewatch	EOS	1.5 km	MPC · JPL
578476	2014 DS_{58}	—	December 9, 2012	Haleakala	Pan-STARRS 1	·	1.6 km	MPC · JPL
578477	2014 DT_{58}	—	December 30, 2007	Kitt Peak	Spacewatch	·	1.9 km	MPC · JPL
578478	2014 DU_{58}	—	February 26, 2014	Haleakala	Pan-STARRS 1	·	1.5 km	MPC · JPL
578479	2014 DM_{60}	—	January 7, 2002	Kitt Peak	Spacewatch	·	3.7 km	MPC · JPL
578480	2014 DC_{61}	—	February 9, 2002	Kitt Peak	Spacewatch	·	3.1 km	MPC · JPL
578481	2014 DZ_{61}	—	August 30, 2005	Kitt Peak	Spacewatch	·	2.6 km	MPC · JPL
578482	2014 DM_{62}	—	February 26, 2014	Haleakala	Pan-STARRS 1	THM	1.6 km	MPC · JPL
578483	2014 DP_{62}	—	February 26, 2014	Haleakala	Pan-STARRS 1	(31811)	2.2 km	MPC · JPL
578484	2014 DD_{64}	—	February 26, 2014	Haleakala	Pan-STARRS 1	·	2.9 km	MPC · JPL
578485	2014 DO_{64}	—	February 26, 2014	Haleakala	Pan-STARRS 1	·	2.3 km	MPC · JPL
578486	2014 DJ_{67}	—	March 18, 2009	Kitt Peak	Spacewatch	·	2.6 km	MPC · JPL
578487	2014 DU_{67}	—	February 16, 2004	Kitt Peak	Spacewatch	·	690 m	MPC · JPL
578488	2014 DE_{68}	—	February 26, 2014	Haleakala	Pan-STARRS 1	·	1.9 km	MPC · JPL
578489	2014 DK_{70}	—	February 26, 2014	Haleakala	Pan-STARRS 1	·	2.0 km	MPC · JPL
578490	2014 DN_{70}	—	March 26, 2009	Kitt Peak	Spacewatch	·	2.4 km	MPC · JPL
578491	2014 DX_{72}	—	September 28, 2011	Kitt Peak	Spacewatch	EOS	1.8 km	MPC · JPL
578492	2014 DB_{74}	—	April 28, 2009	Mount Lemmon	Mount Lemmon Survey	·	1.9 km	MPC · JPL
578493	2014 DF_{75}	—	August 6, 2005	Palomar	NEAT	·	3.3 km	MPC · JPL
578494	2014 DL_{75}	—	January 21, 2002	Kitt Peak	Spacewatch	VER	2.9 km	MPC · JPL
578495	2014 DP_{75}	—	January 30, 2008	Mount Lemmon	Mount Lemmon Survey	EOS	1.8 km	MPC · JPL
578496	2014 DN_{77}	—	February 26, 2014	Haleakala	Pan-STARRS 1	·	2.1 km	MPC · JPL
578497	2014 DZ_{77}	—	February 26, 2014	Haleakala	Pan-STARRS 1	·	1.7 km	MPC · JPL
578498	2014 DD_{78}	—	March 16, 2009	Kitt Peak	Spacewatch	·	1.5 km	MPC · JPL
578499	2014 DN_{78}	—	August 21, 2004	Kitt Peak	Spacewatch	·	2.4 km	MPC · JPL
578500	2014 DS_{78}	—	February 26, 2014	Haleakala	Pan-STARRS 1	EOS	1.4 km	MPC · JPL

== 578501–578600 ==
back to top

Designation			Discovery			Properties		Ref
Permanent	Provisional	Named after	Date	Site	Discoverer(s)	Category	Diam.	Ref
578501	2014 DW_{80}	—	September 22, 2003	Kitt Peak	Spacewatch	·	1.3 km	MPC · JPL
578502	2014 DK_{82}	—	September 18, 2011	Mount Lemmon	Mount Lemmon Survey	·	2.4 km	MPC · JPL
578503	2014 DU_{84}	—	August 27, 2011	Haleakala	Pan-STARRS 1	·	2.2 km	MPC · JPL
578504	2014 DG_{85}	—	February 25, 2014	Kitt Peak	Spacewatch	·	2.2 km	MPC · JPL
578505	2014 DN_{86}	—	February 26, 2014	Mount Lemmon	Mount Lemmon Survey	·	2.4 km	MPC · JPL
578506	2014 DE_{88}	—	September 13, 2002	Palomar	NEAT	KOR	1.2 km	MPC · JPL
578507	2014 DG_{91}	—	September 23, 2011	Kitt Peak	Spacewatch	·	2.5 km	MPC · JPL
578508	2014 DQ_{92}	—	February 26, 2014	Mount Lemmon	Mount Lemmon Survey	·	1.9 km	MPC · JPL
578509	2014 DS_{94}	—	March 11, 2003	Palomar	NEAT	TIR	3.6 km	MPC · JPL
578510	2014 DM_{95}	—	February 26, 2014	Haleakala	Pan-STARRS 1	·	620 m	MPC · JPL
578511	2014 DN_{96}	—	February 26, 2014	Haleakala	Pan-STARRS 1	·	2.3 km	MPC · JPL
578512	2014 DV_{96}	—	February 26, 2014	Haleakala	Pan-STARRS 1	·	2.2 km	MPC · JPL
578513	2014 DX_{98}	—	October 20, 2007	Mount Lemmon	Mount Lemmon Survey	·	1.4 km	MPC · JPL
578514	2014 DZ_{99}	—	January 25, 2014	Haleakala	Pan-STARRS 1	·	990 m	MPC · JPL
578515	2014 DH_{104}	—	February 27, 2014	Mount Lemmon	Mount Lemmon Survey	·	2.6 km	MPC · JPL
578516	2014 DB_{105}	—	October 14, 2001	Cima Ekar	ADAS	·	2.4 km	MPC · JPL
578517	2014 DU_{105}	—	September 4, 2011	Haleakala	Pan-STARRS 1	EMA	2.3 km	MPC · JPL
578518	2014 DD_{106}	—	February 27, 2014	Mount Lemmon	Mount Lemmon Survey	EOS	1.6 km	MPC · JPL
578519	2014 DZ_{106}	—	February 27, 2014	Mount Lemmon	Mount Lemmon Survey	·	2.5 km	MPC · JPL
578520	2014 DF_{108}	—	September 2, 2011	Charleston	R. Holmes	·	3.0 km	MPC · JPL
578521	2014 DG_{108}	—	January 16, 2005	Mauna Kea	Veillet, C.	·	1.1 km	MPC · JPL
578522	2014 DO_{108}	—	September 20, 2011	Haleakala	Pan-STARRS 1	·	1.3 km	MPC · JPL
578523	2014 DV_{108}	—	March 8, 2003	Socorro	LINEAR	·	3.2 km	MPC · JPL
578524	2014 DY_{108}	—	December 5, 2002	Socorro	LINEAR	·	2.4 km	MPC · JPL
578525	2014 DY_{109}	—	February 27, 2014	Haleakala	Pan-STARRS 1	·	2.0 km	MPC · JPL
578526	2014 DL_{111}	—	March 30, 2003	Kitt Peak	Spacewatch	·	2.9 km	MPC · JPL
578527	2014 DG_{114}	—	July 7, 2005	Mauna Kea	Veillet, C.	·	2.2 km	MPC · JPL
578528	2014 DK_{115}	—	February 9, 2014	Haleakala	Pan-STARRS 1	·	1.5 km	MPC · JPL
578529	2014 DH_{119}	—	September 4, 2011	Haleakala	Pan-STARRS 1	·	2.0 km	MPC · JPL
578530	2014 DB_{121}	—	November 15, 2006	Kitt Peak	Spacewatch	·	2.1 km	MPC · JPL
578531	2014 DP_{121}	—	February 28, 2014	Haleakala	Pan-STARRS 1	·	1.4 km	MPC · JPL
578532	2014 DU_{122}	—	February 25, 2014	Kitt Peak	Spacewatch	·	2.2 km	MPC · JPL
578533	2014 DV_{122}	—	March 7, 2003	St. Véran	St. Veran	THM	2.1 km	MPC · JPL
578534	2014 DR_{124}	—	April 30, 2011	Mount Lemmon	Mount Lemmon Survey	·	480 m	MPC · JPL
578535	2014 DS_{124}	—	May 30, 2006	Kitt Peak	Spacewatch	EUN	1.1 km	MPC · JPL
578536	2014 DY_{124}	—	March 27, 2003	Palomar	NEAT	·	2.8 km	MPC · JPL
578537	2014 DS_{125}	—	December 5, 2007	Kitt Peak	Spacewatch	·	2.2 km	MPC · JPL
578538	2014 DD_{127}	—	September 26, 2011	Haleakala	Pan-STARRS 1	·	2.1 km	MPC · JPL
578539	2014 DN_{127}	—	October 11, 2012	Piszkéstető	K. Sárneczky	·	1.2 km	MPC · JPL
578540	2014 DU_{127}	—	February 22, 2014	Kitt Peak	Spacewatch	·	2.6 km	MPC · JPL
578541	2014 DY_{127}	—	April 5, 2003	Kitt Peak	Spacewatch	·	2.9 km	MPC · JPL
578542	2014 DT_{128}	—	November 3, 2007	Kitt Peak	Spacewatch	KOR	1.2 km	MPC · JPL
578543	2014 DE_{129}	—	February 28, 2014	Haleakala	Pan-STARRS 1	EOS	1.4 km	MPC · JPL
578544	2014 DO_{130}	—	February 28, 2014	Haleakala	Pan-STARRS 1	·	2.2 km	MPC · JPL
578545	2014 DH_{131}	—	February 28, 2014	Haleakala	Pan-STARRS 1	·	1.2 km	MPC · JPL
578546	2014 DR_{131}	—	February 28, 2014	Haleakala	Pan-STARRS 1	·	1.8 km	MPC · JPL
578547	2014 DS_{131}	—	August 28, 2006	Kitt Peak	Spacewatch	·	2.0 km	MPC · JPL
578548	2014 DC_{133}	—	January 9, 2002	Kitt Peak	Spacewatch	·	2.9 km	MPC · JPL
578549	2014 DN_{133}	—	February 22, 2014	Kitt Peak	Spacewatch	·	2.3 km	MPC · JPL
578550	2014 DO_{135}	—	January 10, 2008	Mount Lemmon	Mount Lemmon Survey	HYG	3.2 km	MPC · JPL
578551	2014 DN_{136}	—	February 28, 2014	Haleakala	Pan-STARRS 1	·	2.1 km	MPC · JPL
578552	2014 DV_{136}	—	February 28, 2014	Haleakala	Pan-STARRS 1	·	2.4 km	MPC · JPL
578553	2014 DK_{137}	—	February 25, 2014	Kitt Peak	Spacewatch	·	2.4 km	MPC · JPL
578554	2014 DD_{139}	—	November 8, 2007	Kitt Peak	Spacewatch	·	2.2 km	MPC · JPL
578555	2014 DT_{139}	—	August 28, 2006	Kitt Peak	Spacewatch	EOS	1.9 km	MPC · JPL
578556	2014 DV_{139}	—	June 15, 2010	Mount Lemmon	Mount Lemmon Survey	·	2.4 km	MPC · JPL
578557	2014 DG_{141}	—	March 10, 2003	Kitt Peak	Spacewatch	·	2.4 km	MPC · JPL
578558	2014 DT_{142}	—	February 21, 2003	Palomar	NEAT	·	3.6 km	MPC · JPL
578559	2014 DC_{143}	—	February 20, 2014	Haleakala	Pan-STARRS 1	centaur	50 km	MPC · JPL
578560	2014 DC_{148}	—	February 7, 2008	Mount Lemmon	Mount Lemmon Survey	EOS	1.7 km	MPC · JPL
578561	2014 DV_{149}	—	February 20, 2014	Mount Lemmon	Mount Lemmon Survey	·	2.3 km	MPC · JPL
578562	2014 DD_{150}	—	March 23, 2003	Apache Point	SDSS Collaboration	·	2.7 km	MPC · JPL
578563	2014 DH_{150}	—	May 1, 2009	Mount Lemmon	Mount Lemmon Survey	·	2.4 km	MPC · JPL
578564	2014 DQ_{150}	—	February 26, 2014	Haleakala	Pan-STARRS 1	·	1.7 km	MPC · JPL
578565	2014 DZ_{150}	—	September 24, 2008	Mount Lemmon	Mount Lemmon Survey	·	1.3 km	MPC · JPL
578566	2014 DD_{151}	—	February 26, 2014	Haleakala	Pan-STARRS 1	·	990 m	MPC · JPL
578567	2014 DO_{151}	—	March 8, 2003	Kitt Peak	Spacewatch	·	2.1 km	MPC · JPL
578568	2014 DO_{155}	—	April 4, 2005	Mount Lemmon	Mount Lemmon Survey	·	1.9 km	MPC · JPL
578569	2014 DJ_{156}	—	February 27, 2014	Haleakala	Pan-STARRS 1	EOS	1.4 km	MPC · JPL
578570	2014 DL_{156}	—	February 24, 2014	Haleakala	Pan-STARRS 1	·	2.0 km	MPC · JPL
578571	2014 DZ_{156}	—	February 28, 2014	Haleakala	Pan-STARRS 1	MAR	860 m	MPC · JPL
578572	2014 DJ_{157}	—	February 20, 2014	Mount Lemmon	Mount Lemmon Survey	·	2.7 km	MPC · JPL
578573	2014 DB_{161}	—	February 24, 2014	Haleakala	Pan-STARRS 1	·	1.2 km	MPC · JPL
578574	2014 DD_{162}	—	March 8, 2008	Mount Lemmon	Mount Lemmon Survey	THM	1.7 km	MPC · JPL
578575	2014 DM_{162}	—	February 24, 2014	Haleakala	Pan-STARRS 1	·	2.6 km	MPC · JPL
578576	2014 DP_{162}	—	September 27, 2016	Haleakala	Pan-STARRS 1	·	940 m	MPC · JPL
578577	2014 DR_{162}	—	May 21, 2015	Haleakala	Pan-STARRS 1	·	1.5 km	MPC · JPL
578578	2014 DK_{164}	—	May 22, 2015	Haleakala	Pan-STARRS 1	EOS	1.4 km	MPC · JPL
578579	2014 DP_{164}	—	February 28, 2014	Mount Lemmon	Mount Lemmon Survey	EOS	1.4 km	MPC · JPL
578580	2014 DR_{167}	—	February 26, 2014	Mount Lemmon	Mount Lemmon Survey	EOS	1.4 km	MPC · JPL
578581	2014 DS_{168}	—	February 27, 2014	Mount Lemmon	Mount Lemmon Survey	EOS	1.7 km	MPC · JPL
578582	2014 DA_{169}	—	February 19, 2014	Kitt Peak	Spacewatch	LIX	3.0 km	MPC · JPL
578583	2014 DG_{169}	—	February 24, 2014	Haleakala	Pan-STARRS 1	·	2.2 km	MPC · JPL
578584	2014 DM_{169}	—	February 26, 2014	Mount Lemmon	Mount Lemmon Survey	EOS	1.5 km	MPC · JPL
578585	2014 DB_{170}	—	February 28, 2014	Haleakala	Pan-STARRS 1	EOS	1.5 km	MPC · JPL
578586	2014 DK_{170}	—	February 26, 2014	Mount Lemmon	Mount Lemmon Survey	EOS	1.3 km	MPC · JPL
578587	2014 DY_{170}	—	February 28, 2014	Haleakala	Pan-STARRS 1	·	1.4 km	MPC · JPL
578588	2014 DA_{171}	—	February 22, 2014	Kitt Peak	Spacewatch	·	2.5 km	MPC · JPL
578589	2014 DB_{171}	—	February 24, 2014	Haleakala	Pan-STARRS 1	·	2.1 km	MPC · JPL
578590	2014 DC_{171}	—	February 26, 2014	Haleakala	Pan-STARRS 1	EOS	1.7 km	MPC · JPL
578591	2014 DG_{171}	—	February 26, 2014	Mount Lemmon	Mount Lemmon Survey	·	2.5 km	MPC · JPL
578592	2014 DV_{171}	—	February 26, 2014	Haleakala	Pan-STARRS 1	·	2.1 km	MPC · JPL
578593	2014 DC_{172}	—	February 26, 2014	Haleakala	Pan-STARRS 1	·	1.5 km	MPC · JPL
578594	2014 DE_{172}	—	February 27, 2014	Haleakala	Pan-STARRS 1	EOS	1.6 km	MPC · JPL
578595	2014 DJ_{172}	—	February 28, 2014	Haleakala	Pan-STARRS 1	·	2.3 km	MPC · JPL
578596	2014 DG_{173}	—	February 27, 2014	Haleakala	Pan-STARRS 1	·	1.5 km	MPC · JPL
578597	2014 DO_{173}	—	February 24, 2014	Haleakala	Pan-STARRS 1	·	2.1 km	MPC · JPL
578598	2014 DG_{174}	—	September 18, 1999	Kitt Peak	Spacewatch	·	3.0 km	MPC · JPL
578599	2014 DJ_{176}	—	February 27, 2014	Haleakala	Pan-STARRS 1	VER	2.1 km	MPC · JPL
578600	2014 DL_{176}	—	February 28, 2014	Haleakala	Pan-STARRS 1	EOS	1.4 km	MPC · JPL

== 578601–578700 ==
back to top

Designation			Discovery			Properties		Ref
Permanent	Provisional	Named after	Date	Site	Discoverer(s)	Category	Diam.	Ref
578601	2014 DB_{179}	—	February 26, 2014	Haleakala	Pan-STARRS 1	·	1.1 km	MPC · JPL
578602	2014 DF_{179}	—	February 26, 2014	Haleakala	Pan-STARRS 1	·	2.5 km	MPC · JPL
578603	2014 DH_{179}	—	May 7, 2010	WISE	WISE	·	2.3 km	MPC · JPL
578604	2014 DJ_{179}	—	February 27, 2014	Mount Lemmon	Mount Lemmon Survey	EOS	1.6 km	MPC · JPL
578605	2014 DA_{182}	—	February 28, 2014	Haleakala	Pan-STARRS 1	·	800 m	MPC · JPL
578606	2014 DN_{182}	—	February 28, 2014	Mount Lemmon	Mount Lemmon Survey	·	650 m	MPC · JPL
578607	2014 DM_{183}	—	April 13, 2004	Kitt Peak	Spacewatch	·	570 m	MPC · JPL
578608	2014 EM_{1}	—	February 10, 2008	Kitt Peak	Spacewatch	·	2.7 km	MPC · JPL
578609	2014 ED_{2}	—	August 27, 2011	Haleakala	Pan-STARRS 1	EOS	1.5 km	MPC · JPL
578610	2014 EG_{2}	—	October 23, 2011	Mount Lemmon	Mount Lemmon Survey	·	2.4 km	MPC · JPL
578611	2014 EZ_{2}	—	October 21, 2006	Kitt Peak	Spacewatch	·	2.2 km	MPC · JPL
578612	2014 EJ_{5}	—	September 8, 2000	Kitt Peak	Spacewatch	·	2.9 km	MPC · JPL
578613	2014 EQ_{7}	—	June 22, 2009	Bergisch Gladbach	W. Bickel	·	2.4 km	MPC · JPL
578614	2014 EF_{8}	—	March 13, 2011	Kitt Peak	Spacewatch	·	590 m	MPC · JPL
578615	2014 EX_{8}	—	May 22, 2001	Kitt Peak	Spacewatch	·	1.6 km	MPC · JPL
578616	2014 EG_{9}	—	March 6, 2014	Mount Lemmon	Mount Lemmon Survey	·	1.3 km	MPC · JPL
578617	2014 EG_{11}	—	March 7, 2014	Mount Lemmon	Mount Lemmon Survey	·	1.8 km	MPC · JPL
578618	2014 EY_{11}	—	March 18, 2009	Catalina	CSS	·	2.9 km	MPC · JPL
578619	2014 EG_{15}	—	March 8, 2003	Kitt Peak	Spacewatch	·	2.3 km	MPC · JPL
578620	2014 ET_{16}	—	February 27, 2014	Mount Lemmon	Mount Lemmon Survey	VER	2.3 km	MPC · JPL
578621	2014 EE_{17}	—	March 7, 2014	Mount Lemmon	Mount Lemmon Survey	EOS	1.5 km	MPC · JPL
578622 Fergezsuzsa	2014 EN_{17}	Fergezsuzsa	October 21, 2012	Piszkéstető	K. Sárneczky, G. Hodosán	·	2.6 km	MPC · JPL
578623	2014 EU_{17}	—	November 8, 2013	Mount Lemmon	Mount Lemmon Survey	·	2.8 km	MPC · JPL
578624	2014 ED_{20}	—	September 30, 2006	Mount Lemmon	Mount Lemmon Survey	·	2.2 km	MPC · JPL
578625	2014 EG_{20}	—	December 13, 2006	Mount Lemmon	Mount Lemmon Survey	·	430 m	MPC · JPL
578626	2014 EV_{20}	—	July 29, 2000	Cerro Tololo	Deep Ecliptic Survey	·	3.1 km	MPC · JPL
578627	2014 EP_{21}	—	December 19, 2007	Mount Lemmon	Mount Lemmon Survey	EOS	2.1 km	MPC · JPL
578628	2014 ET_{22}	—	March 8, 2014	Kitt Peak	Spacewatch	·	1.5 km	MPC · JPL
578629	2014 EM_{25}	—	September 21, 2001	Apache Point	SDSS	EOS	2.6 km	MPC · JPL
578630	2014 ES_{26}	—	February 28, 2014	Haleakala	Pan-STARRS 1	·	2.4 km	MPC · JPL
578631	2014 EH_{27}	—	March 5, 2014	Haleakala	Pan-STARRS 1	·	2.5 km	MPC · JPL
578632	2014 ER_{28}	—	October 14, 2012	Kitt Peak	Spacewatch	·	620 m	MPC · JPL
578633	2014 EG_{30}	—	March 11, 2008	Mount Lemmon	Mount Lemmon Survey	·	3.0 km	MPC · JPL
578634	2014 EC_{34}	—	November 25, 2002	Palomar	NEAT	·	2.8 km	MPC · JPL
578635	2014 EV_{36}	—	January 14, 2008	Kitt Peak	Spacewatch	EOS	1.7 km	MPC · JPL
578636	2014 EW_{37}	—	September 17, 2009	Mount Lemmon	Mount Lemmon Survey	L4	8.5 km	MPC · JPL
578637	2014 EE_{38}	—	March 8, 2014	Mount Lemmon	Mount Lemmon Survey	VER	2.9 km	MPC · JPL
578638	2014 EY_{39}	—	April 13, 2004	Kitt Peak	Spacewatch	·	2.3 km	MPC · JPL
578639	2014 EC_{40}	—	April 5, 2011	Mount Lemmon	Mount Lemmon Survey	·	580 m	MPC · JPL
578640	2014 ET_{40}	—	December 17, 2007	Kitt Peak	Spacewatch	·	1.9 km	MPC · JPL
578641	2014 EC_{41}	—	March 8, 2014	Mount Lemmon	Mount Lemmon Survey	·	2.4 km	MPC · JPL
578642	2014 ED_{41}	—	March 8, 2014	Mount Lemmon	Mount Lemmon Survey	·	2.3 km	MPC · JPL
578643	2014 EM_{41}	—	December 6, 2007	Kitt Peak	Spacewatch	·	1.7 km	MPC · JPL
578644	2014 EV_{41}	—	March 8, 2014	Mount Lemmon	Mount Lemmon Survey	EOS	1.4 km	MPC · JPL
578645	2014 ET_{42}	—	September 24, 2011	Haleakala	Pan-STARRS 1	·	2.3 km	MPC · JPL
578646	2014 EF_{46}	—	March 11, 2014	Kitt Peak	Spacewatch	·	1.0 km	MPC · JPL
578647	2014 ES_{47}	—	April 9, 2003	Kitt Peak	Spacewatch	LIX	2.8 km	MPC · JPL
578648	2014 EC_{48}	—	March 11, 2014	Mount Lemmon	Mount Lemmon Survey	·	2.6 km	MPC · JPL
578649	2014 EF_{48}	—	March 31, 2003	Apache Point	SDSS Collaboration	TIR	2.5 km	MPC · JPL
578650	2014 EM_{50}	—	October 16, 2001	Cima Ekar	ADAS	EOS	2.4 km	MPC · JPL
578651	2014 ET_{50}	—	February 28, 2003	Haleakala	NEAT	·	3.2 km	MPC · JPL
578652	2014 EV_{50}	—	June 3, 2009	Mount Lemmon	Mount Lemmon Survey	·	3.5 km	MPC · JPL
578653	2014 EG_{52}	—	March 7, 2014	Mount Lemmon	Mount Lemmon Survey	·	1.7 km	MPC · JPL
578654	2014 EV_{53}	—	March 2, 2014	Cerro Tololo	DECam	L4	6.8 km	MPC · JPL
578655	2014 EA_{56}	—	August 29, 2016	Mount Lemmon	Mount Lemmon Survey	·	1.4 km	MPC · JPL
578656	2014 EH_{58}	—	February 28, 2014	Haleakala	Pan-STARRS 1	·	2.5 km	MPC · JPL
578657	2014 EQ_{58}	—	December 20, 2007	Mount Lemmon	Mount Lemmon Survey	EOS	1.6 km	MPC · JPL
578658	2014 EW_{68}	—	October 19, 2011	Mount Lemmon	Mount Lemmon Survey	·	2.1 km	MPC · JPL
578659	2014 ER_{73}	—	September 14, 2007	Mount Lemmon	Mount Lemmon Survey	·	1.5 km	MPC · JPL
578660	2014 ET_{78}	—	September 30, 2006	Kitt Peak	Spacewatch	EOS	1.4 km	MPC · JPL
578661	2014 EG_{79}	—	February 28, 2014	Haleakala	Pan-STARRS 1	·	2.0 km	MPC · JPL
578662	2014 EY_{83}	—	October 3, 1999	Kitt Peak	Spacewatch	·	540 m	MPC · JPL
578663	2014 EE_{84}	—	September 4, 2011	Haleakala	Pan-STARRS 1	·	2.7 km	MPC · JPL
578664	2014 EJ_{87}	—	December 8, 2017	Haleakala	Pan-STARRS 1	·	1.4 km	MPC · JPL
578665	2014 EL_{87}	—	October 4, 2006	Mount Lemmon	Mount Lemmon Survey	·	1.9 km	MPC · JPL
578666	2014 EE_{99}	—	May 21, 2015	Haleakala	Pan-STARRS 1	·	1.5 km	MPC · JPL
578667	2014 EC_{100}	—	August 14, 2016	Haleakala	Pan-STARRS 1	·	1.4 km	MPC · JPL
578668	2014 EC_{103}	—	October 12, 2016	Haleakala	Pan-STARRS 1	·	1.1 km	MPC · JPL
578669	2014 EM_{114}	—	September 19, 2006	Kitt Peak	Spacewatch	·	2.2 km	MPC · JPL
578670	2014 EP_{117}	—	July 7, 2016	Haleakala	Pan-STARRS 1	·	1.5 km	MPC · JPL
578671	2014 EM_{126}	—	July 1, 2011	Kitt Peak	Spacewatch	·	1.7 km	MPC · JPL
578672	2014 EV_{128}	—	November 19, 2007	Kitt Peak	Spacewatch	·	2.0 km	MPC · JPL
578673	2014 EP_{131}	—	November 7, 2012	Mount Lemmon	Mount Lemmon Survey	·	1.6 km	MPC · JPL
578674	2014 EG_{134}	—	September 25, 2006	Kitt Peak	Spacewatch	NAE	1.9 km	MPC · JPL
578675	2014 EY_{136}	—	April 20, 2009	Mount Lemmon	Mount Lemmon Survey	·	2.0 km	MPC · JPL
578676	2014 EG_{138}	—	October 2, 2011	Piszkéstető	K. Sárneczky	·	3.2 km	MPC · JPL
578677	2014 EZ_{143}	—	November 2, 2011	Mount Lemmon	Mount Lemmon Survey	·	2.7 km	MPC · JPL
578678	2014 EK_{147}	—	October 6, 2016	Haleakala	Pan-STARRS 1	·	2.1 km	MPC · JPL
578679	2014 EO_{147}	—	May 4, 2010	Kitt Peak	Spacewatch	·	1.6 km	MPC · JPL
578680	2014 ES_{148}	—	October 22, 2012	Haleakala	Pan-STARRS 1	EOS	1.4 km	MPC · JPL
578681	2014 EX_{149}	—	October 22, 2012	Haleakala	Pan-STARRS 1	EOS	1.8 km	MPC · JPL
578682	2014 EU_{151}	—	October 28, 2016	Haleakala	Pan-STARRS 1	·	1.2 km	MPC · JPL
578683	2014 ED_{155}	—	September 26, 2011	Mount Lemmon	Mount Lemmon Survey	·	2.1 km	MPC · JPL
578684	2014 EJ_{155}	—	April 18, 2009	Mount Lemmon	Mount Lemmon Survey	·	2.1 km	MPC · JPL
578685	2014 EK_{163}	—	August 30, 2016	Mount Lemmon	Mount Lemmon Survey	·	2.2 km	MPC · JPL
578686	2014 EG_{167}	—	May 14, 2015	Haleakala	Pan-STARRS 1	·	2.0 km	MPC · JPL
578687	2014 EE_{170}	—	March 19, 2009	Calar Alto	F. Hormuth	·	2.5 km	MPC · JPL
578688	2014 EK_{171}	—	March 18, 2009	Kitt Peak	Spacewatch	·	2.6 km	MPC · JPL
578689	2014 ET_{175}	—	May 27, 2017	Haleakala	Pan-STARRS 1	L4	9.4 km	MPC · JPL
578690	2014 ED_{181}	—	December 18, 2007	Mount Lemmon	Mount Lemmon Survey	EOS	1.5 km	MPC · JPL
578691	2014 EY_{181}	—	August 28, 2016	Mount Lemmon	Mount Lemmon Survey	EOS	1.3 km	MPC · JPL
578692	2014 ED_{182}	—	August 31, 2005	Kitt Peak	Spacewatch	·	3.0 km	MPC · JPL
578693	2014 EP_{182}	—	August 12, 2016	Haleakala	Pan-STARRS 1	·	2.4 km	MPC · JPL
578694	2014 EO_{183}	—	September 17, 2009	Kitt Peak	Spacewatch	L4	8.0 km	MPC · JPL
578695	2014 EH_{197}	—	February 27, 2014	Mount Lemmon	Mount Lemmon Survey	·	1.8 km	MPC · JPL
578696	2014 EO_{197}	—	January 18, 2008	Mount Lemmon	Mount Lemmon Survey	·	2.5 km	MPC · JPL
578697	2014 EO_{202}	—	October 2, 2006	Mount Lemmon	Mount Lemmon Survey	·	1.8 km	MPC · JPL
578698	2014 EW_{202}	—	September 4, 2011	Haleakala	Pan-STARRS 1	·	2.2 km	MPC · JPL
578699	2014 EW_{204}	—	July 12, 2016	Mount Lemmon	Mount Lemmon Survey	·	3.1 km	MPC · JPL
578700	2014 EF_{211}	—	August 22, 2006	Palomar	NEAT	·	2.0 km	MPC · JPL

== 578701–578800 ==
back to top

Designation			Discovery			Properties		Ref
Permanent	Provisional	Named after	Date	Site	Discoverer(s)	Category	Diam.	Ref
578701	2014 EY_{216}	—	November 5, 2007	Mount Lemmon	Mount Lemmon Survey	·	2.3 km	MPC · JPL
578702	2014 EG_{220}	—	March 5, 2014	Cerro Tololo	DECam	·	1.3 km	MPC · JPL
578703	2014 ES_{222}	—	September 4, 2011	Haleakala	Pan-STARRS 1	EOS	1.6 km	MPC · JPL
578704	2014 EY_{223}	—	December 31, 2007	Mount Lemmon	Mount Lemmon Survey	EOS	1.5 km	MPC · JPL
578705	2014 EO_{232}	—	March 23, 2009	Calar Alto	F. Hormuth	·	2.3 km	MPC · JPL
578706	2014 EY_{236}	—	December 31, 2007	Mount Lemmon	Mount Lemmon Survey	·	2.3 km	MPC · JPL
578707	2014 EF_{237}	—	February 28, 2014	Haleakala	Pan-STARRS 1	BRG	1 km	MPC · JPL
578708	2014 ES_{237}	—	September 19, 2006	Kitt Peak	Spacewatch	·	1.8 km	MPC · JPL
578709	2014 EK_{239}	—	March 5, 2014	Cerro Tololo	DECam	·	1.1 km	MPC · JPL
578710	2014 ES_{245}	—	October 29, 2017	Haleakala	Pan-STARRS 1	EOS	1.6 km	MPC · JPL
578711	2014 EG_{247}	—	April 27, 2009	Kitt Peak	Spacewatch	·	2.1 km	MPC · JPL
578712	2014 EX_{247}	—	October 3, 2015	Mount Lemmon	Mount Lemmon Survey	·	550 m	MPC · JPL
578713	2014 EB_{249}	—	June 5, 2003	Kitt Peak	Spacewatch	·	4.1 km	MPC · JPL
578714	2014 EA_{250}	—	November 12, 2007	Mount Lemmon	Mount Lemmon Survey	·	1.6 km	MPC · JPL
578715	2014 EJ_{250}	—	March 12, 2014	Mount Lemmon	Mount Lemmon Survey	EUN	1.1 km	MPC · JPL
578716	2014 ER_{251}	—	October 28, 2017	Mount Lemmon	Mount Lemmon Survey	·	2.3 km	MPC · JPL
578717	2014 EB_{252}	—	March 10, 2014	Mount Lemmon	Mount Lemmon Survey	·	2.6 km	MPC · JPL
578718	2014 EC_{252}	—	June 22, 2015	Haleakala	Pan-STARRS 2	EOS	1.5 km	MPC · JPL
578719	2014 EH_{252}	—	March 7, 2014	Kitt Peak	Spacewatch	·	2.5 km	MPC · JPL
578720	2014 EM_{252}	—	March 5, 2014	Kitt Peak	Spacewatch	·	1.2 km	MPC · JPL
578721	2014 EU_{252}	—	March 7, 2014	Mount Lemmon	Mount Lemmon Survey	HYG	2.6 km	MPC · JPL
578722	2014 EV_{252}	—	March 5, 2014	Kitt Peak	Spacewatch	·	1.6 km	MPC · JPL
578723	2014 ED_{253}	—	March 12, 2014	Mount Lemmon	Mount Lemmon Survey	·	2.6 km	MPC · JPL
578724	2014 EE_{253}	—	March 11, 2014	Kitt Peak	Spacewatch	·	2.0 km	MPC · JPL
578725	2014 EF_{253}	—	March 5, 2014	Haleakala	Pan-STARRS 1	EOS	1.5 km	MPC · JPL
578726	2014 EJ_{253}	—	March 10, 2014	Mount Lemmon	Mount Lemmon Survey	·	2.0 km	MPC · JPL
578727	2014 EQ_{253}	—	March 11, 2014	Mount Lemmon	Mount Lemmon Survey	·	2.0 km	MPC · JPL
578728	2014 ES_{253}	—	March 10, 2014	Mount Lemmon	Mount Lemmon Survey	·	2.9 km	MPC · JPL
578729	2014 FT	—	December 6, 2010	Kitt Peak	Spacewatch	H	560 m	MPC · JPL
578730	2014 FB_{2}	—	September 24, 2011	Haleakala	Pan-STARRS 1	EOS	1.5 km	MPC · JPL
578731	2014 FG_{2}	—	January 14, 2008	Kitt Peak	Spacewatch	EOS	1.7 km	MPC · JPL
578732	2014 FH_{2}	—	January 11, 2008	Kitt Peak	Spacewatch	·	2.3 km	MPC · JPL
578733	2014 FM_{3}	—	March 12, 2014	Mount Lemmon	Mount Lemmon Survey	TEL	1.1 km	MPC · JPL
578734	2014 FV_{3}	—	August 30, 2011	Haleakala	Pan-STARRS 1	·	2.2 km	MPC · JPL
578735	2014 FF_{4}	—	March 12, 2014	Mount Lemmon	Mount Lemmon Survey	EMA	2.3 km	MPC · JPL
578736	2014 FR_{4}	—	March 12, 2014	Mount Lemmon	Mount Lemmon Survey	EOS	1.6 km	MPC · JPL
578737	2014 FJ_{5}	—	November 19, 2012	Kitt Peak	Spacewatch	·	1.8 km	MPC · JPL
578738	2014 FK_{5}	—	September 24, 2011	Haleakala	Pan-STARRS 1	·	2.4 km	MPC · JPL
578739	2014 FN_{5}	—	March 20, 2014	Mount Lemmon	Mount Lemmon Survey	·	2.8 km	MPC · JPL
578740	2014 FU_{5}	—	October 14, 2001	Apache Point	SDSS Collaboration	·	1.9 km	MPC · JPL
578741	2014 FE_{9}	—	September 15, 2006	Kitt Peak	Spacewatch	EOS	2.1 km	MPC · JPL
578742	2014 FR_{9}	—	September 26, 2011	Mount Lemmon	Mount Lemmon Survey	EOS	1.6 km	MPC · JPL
578743	2014 FZ_{10}	—	March 6, 2014	Kitt Peak	Spacewatch	·	2.3 km	MPC · JPL
578744	2014 FS_{12}	—	September 26, 2006	Mount Lemmon	Mount Lemmon Survey	EOS	1.4 km	MPC · JPL
578745	2014 FY_{12}	—	December 23, 2012	Haleakala	Pan-STARRS 1	·	2.6 km	MPC · JPL
578746	2014 FP_{13}	—	March 20, 2014	Mount Lemmon	Mount Lemmon Survey	·	2.4 km	MPC · JPL
578747	2014 FW_{13}	—	March 20, 2014	Mount Lemmon	Mount Lemmon Survey	·	2.5 km	MPC · JPL
578748	2014 FH_{15}	—	January 2, 2006	Catalina	CSS	H	510 m	MPC · JPL
578749	2014 FT_{16}	—	February 28, 2014	Haleakala	Pan-STARRS 1	·	2.3 km	MPC · JPL
578750	2014 FB_{18}	—	August 28, 2005	Kitt Peak	Spacewatch	·	2.6 km	MPC · JPL
578751	2014 FP_{18}	—	March 23, 2014	La Palma	La Palma	MRX	710 m	MPC · JPL
578752	2014 FN_{19}	—	December 13, 2013	Mount Lemmon	Mount Lemmon Survey	ADE	1.4 km	MPC · JPL
578753	2014 FJ_{21}	—	October 19, 2011	Mount Lemmon	Mount Lemmon Survey	·	2.6 km	MPC · JPL
578754	2014 FO_{22}	—	December 4, 2012	Mount Lemmon	Mount Lemmon Survey	TEL	980 m	MPC · JPL
578755	2014 FN_{23}	—	March 23, 2014	Mount Lemmon	Mount Lemmon Survey	·	2.6 km	MPC · JPL
578756	2014 FX_{23}	—	October 2, 2006	Mount Lemmon	Mount Lemmon Survey	·	3.1 km	MPC · JPL
578757	2014 FU_{24}	—	November 25, 2012	Kitt Peak	Spacewatch	·	2.6 km	MPC · JPL
578758	2014 FG_{25}	—	July 11, 2005	Kitt Peak	Spacewatch	·	2.4 km	MPC · JPL
578759	2014 FJ_{25}	—	September 4, 2011	Haleakala	Pan-STARRS 1	·	2.4 km	MPC · JPL
578760	2014 FL_{25}	—	March 23, 2014	Mount Lemmon	Mount Lemmon Survey	·	2.1 km	MPC · JPL
578761	2014 FP_{26}	—	October 27, 2006	Mount Lemmon	Mount Lemmon Survey	EOS	1.6 km	MPC · JPL
578762	2014 FM_{27}	—	December 5, 2007	Mount Lemmon	Mount Lemmon Survey	·	1.6 km	MPC · JPL
578763	2014 FY_{27}	—	March 26, 2009	Kitt Peak	Spacewatch	·	2.3 km	MPC · JPL
578764	2014 FE_{29}	—	September 21, 2011	Kitt Peak	Spacewatch	·	2.5 km	MPC · JPL
578765	2014 FW_{30}	—	October 18, 2011	Kitt Peak	Spacewatch	·	2.7 km	MPC · JPL
578766	2014 FB_{31}	—	October 15, 2001	Palomar	NEAT	·	2.5 km	MPC · JPL
578767	2014 FU_{34}	—	September 20, 2011	Haleakala	Pan-STARRS 1	·	2.5 km	MPC · JPL
578768	2014 FZ_{38}	—	March 27, 2003	Kitt Peak	Spacewatch	LIX	3.0 km	MPC · JPL
578769	2014 FG_{39}	—	January 25, 2006	Nashville	Clingan, R.	·	2.0 km	MPC · JPL
578770	2014 FT_{41}	—	January 8, 2013	Oukaïmeden	M. Ory	·	2.8 km	MPC · JPL
578771	2014 FN_{43}	—	September 4, 2011	Haleakala	Pan-STARRS 1	·	2.1 km	MPC · JPL
578772	2014 FE_{45}	—	March 20, 2004	Kitt Peak	Spacewatch	·	2.5 km	MPC · JPL
578773	2014 FM_{45}	—	March 11, 2014	Mount Lemmon	Mount Lemmon Survey	·	1.7 km	MPC · JPL
578774	2014 FQ_{45}	—	March 11, 2014	Mount Lemmon	Mount Lemmon Survey	·	1.9 km	MPC · JPL
578775	2014 FG_{46}	—	March 11, 2014	Mount Lemmon	Mount Lemmon Survey	·	2.1 km	MPC · JPL
578776	2014 FB_{48}	—	May 18, 2001	Anderson Mesa	LONEOS	T_{j} (2.97)	4.8 km	MPC · JPL
578777	2014 FO_{48}	—	February 2, 2008	Catalina	CSS	·	3.6 km	MPC · JPL
578778	2014 FL_{52}	—	March 31, 2014	Mount Lemmon	Mount Lemmon Survey	·	2.2 km	MPC · JPL
578779	2014 FO_{53}	—	January 7, 2013	Mount Lemmon	Mount Lemmon Survey	·	2.6 km	MPC · JPL
578780	2014 FP_{56}	—	March 31, 2014	Mount Lemmon	Mount Lemmon Survey	·	2.2 km	MPC · JPL
578781	2014 FZ_{57}	—	February 22, 2014	Mount Lemmon	Mount Lemmon Survey	THM	2.3 km	MPC · JPL
578782	2014 FD_{58}	—	January 17, 2007	Kitt Peak	Spacewatch	·	430 m	MPC · JPL
578783	2014 FV_{62}	—	February 18, 2008	Catalina	CSS	·	3.6 km	MPC · JPL
578784	2014 FC_{63}	—	February 20, 2002	Kitt Peak	Spacewatch	L4	10 km	MPC · JPL
578785	2014 FQ_{63}	—	April 2, 2009	Mount Lemmon	Mount Lemmon Survey	(31811)	3.5 km	MPC · JPL
578786	2014 FS_{66}	—	February 3, 2008	Catalina	CSS	·	3.2 km	MPC · JPL
578787	2014 FK_{73}	—	April 22, 2009	Mount Lemmon	Mount Lemmon Survey	·	3.0 km	MPC · JPL
578788	2014 FO_{74}	—	March 31, 2014	Mount Lemmon	Mount Lemmon Survey	·	2.6 km	MPC · JPL
578789	2014 FX_{74}	—	March 20, 2001	Kitt Peak	Spacewatch	·	670 m	MPC · JPL
578790	2014 FG_{75}	—	March 24, 2014	Haleakala	Pan-STARRS 1	·	3.0 km	MPC · JPL
578791	2014 FH_{76}	—	October 24, 2011	Kitt Peak	Spacewatch	EOS	1.8 km	MPC · JPL
578792	2014 FP_{77}	—	March 23, 2014	Mount Lemmon	Mount Lemmon Survey	EOS	1.7 km	MPC · JPL
578793	2014 FQ_{77}	—	September 8, 2016	Haleakala	Pan-STARRS 1	·	2.1 km	MPC · JPL
578794	2014 FM_{79}	—	May 25, 2015	Haleakala	Pan-STARRS 1	·	2.0 km	MPC · JPL
578795	2014 FT_{79}	—	September 26, 2017	Haleakala	Pan-STARRS 1	EUP	2.7 km	MPC · JPL
578796	2014 FQ_{80}	—	May 21, 2015	Haleakala	Pan-STARRS 1	·	1.9 km	MPC · JPL
578797	2014 FY_{81}	—	March 24, 2014	Haleakala	Pan-STARRS 1	·	2.1 km	MPC · JPL
578798	2014 FP_{82}	—	March 24, 2014	Haleakala	Pan-STARRS 1	·	2.4 km	MPC · JPL
578799	2014 FQ_{82}	—	March 25, 2014	Mount Lemmon	Mount Lemmon Survey	·	2.3 km	MPC · JPL
578800	2014 FD_{83}	—	March 24, 2014	Haleakala	Pan-STARRS 1	·	2.5 km	MPC · JPL

== 578801–578900 ==
back to top

Designation			Discovery			Properties		Ref
Permanent	Provisional	Named after	Date	Site	Discoverer(s)	Category	Diam.	Ref
578801	2014 FU_{83}	—	March 24, 2014	Haleakala	Pan-STARRS 1	·	2.5 km	MPC · JPL
578802	2014 FD_{86}	—	March 24, 2014	Haleakala	Pan-STARRS 1	·	1.1 km	MPC · JPL
578803	2014 GZ_{1}	—	January 18, 2009	Kitt Peak	Spacewatch	BRA	1.5 km	MPC · JPL
578804	2014 GK_{2}	—	September 11, 2005	Kitt Peak	Spacewatch	·	2.6 km	MPC · JPL
578805	2014 GH_{4}	—	March 26, 2003	Kitt Peak	Spacewatch	·	2.6 km	MPC · JPL
578806	2014 GN_{5}	—	February 19, 2009	Mount Lemmon	Mount Lemmon Survey	·	1.5 km	MPC · JPL
578807	2014 GR_{10}	—	February 28, 2008	Mount Lemmon	Mount Lemmon Survey	·	2.7 km	MPC · JPL
578808	2014 GD_{13}	—	September 4, 2011	Haleakala	Pan-STARRS 1	EOS	2.0 km	MPC · JPL
578809	2014 GC_{15}	—	September 8, 2011	Kitt Peak	Spacewatch	·	1.8 km	MPC · JPL
578810	2014 GV_{15}	—	November 17, 2006	Mount Lemmon	Mount Lemmon Survey	·	2.2 km	MPC · JPL
578811	2014 GU_{18}	—	February 22, 2014	Kitt Peak	Spacewatch	·	2.6 km	MPC · JPL
578812	2014 GU_{20}	—	January 30, 2004	Kitt Peak	Spacewatch	·	490 m	MPC · JPL
578813	2014 GO_{21}	—	April 4, 2014	Mount Lemmon	Mount Lemmon Survey	·	2.5 km	MPC · JPL
578814	2014 GD_{22}	—	March 7, 2008	Mount Lemmon	Mount Lemmon Survey	·	2.6 km	MPC · JPL
578815	2014 GY_{24}	—	January 18, 2008	Kitt Peak	Spacewatch	·	3.0 km	MPC · JPL
578816	2014 GC_{25}	—	November 3, 2011	Mount Lemmon	Mount Lemmon Survey	·	2.9 km	MPC · JPL
578817	2014 GV_{29}	—	April 4, 2014	Haleakala	Pan-STARRS 1	·	2.5 km	MPC · JPL
578818	2014 GE_{32}	—	April 11, 2004	Palomar	NEAT	·	940 m	MPC · JPL
578819	2014 GY_{32}	—	February 26, 2014	Mount Lemmon	Mount Lemmon Survey	·	1.9 km	MPC · JPL
578820	2014 GE_{33}	—	January 19, 2013	Kitt Peak	Spacewatch	·	2.8 km	MPC · JPL
578821	2014 GL_{33}	—	January 10, 2013	Haleakala	Pan-STARRS 1	·	3.0 km	MPC · JPL
578822	2014 GM_{33}	—	April 5, 2014	Haleakala	Pan-STARRS 1	·	2.8 km	MPC · JPL
578823	2014 GH_{37}	—	December 22, 2012	Charleston	R. Holmes	·	2.7 km	MPC · JPL
578824	2014 GH_{40}	—	February 24, 2014	Haleakala	Pan-STARRS 1	·	1.2 km	MPC · JPL
578825	2014 GZ_{43}	—	February 11, 2008	Kitt Peak	Spacewatch	·	3.1 km	MPC · JPL
578826	2014 GJ_{46}	—	October 27, 2006	Pises	Lopez, J.	EOS	2.0 km	MPC · JPL
578827	2014 GU_{51}	—	April 9, 2014	Mount Lemmon	Mount Lemmon Survey	·	1.4 km	MPC · JPL
578828	2014 GS_{52}	—	January 22, 2013	Mount Lemmon	Mount Lemmon Survey	·	2.9 km	MPC · JPL
578829	2014 GU_{52}	—	April 12, 2014	Elena Remote	Oreshko, A.	H	390 m	MPC · JPL
578830	2014 GB_{53}	—	February 10, 2014	Haleakala	Pan-STARRS 1	·	1.4 km	MPC · JPL
578831	2014 GH_{53}	—	April 1, 2014	Catalina	CSS	·	3.3 km	MPC · JPL
578832	2014 GP_{53}	—	April 5, 2014	Haleakala	Pan-STARRS 1	centaur	90 km	MPC · JPL
578833	2014 GV_{53}	—	April 5, 2014	Haleakala	Pan-STARRS 1	SDO	187 km	MPC · JPL
578834	2014 GF_{54}	—	May 8, 2013	Cerro Tololo	S. S. Sheppard, C. A. Trujillo	plutino	195 km	MPC · JPL
578835	2014 GL_{54}	—	April 8, 2014	Haleakala	Pan-STARRS 1	SDO	216 km	MPC · JPL
578836	2014 GB_{55}	—	April 3, 2014	Haleakala	Pan-STARRS 1	·	1.5 km	MPC · JPL
578837	2014 GG_{55}	—	March 31, 2014	Kitt Peak	Spacewatch	·	2.7 km	MPC · JPL
578838	2014 GP_{57}	—	March 10, 2008	Mount Lemmon	Mount Lemmon Survey	(895)	2.7 km	MPC · JPL
578839	2014 GT_{57}	—	February 13, 2008	Catalina	CSS	LIX	3.2 km	MPC · JPL
578840	2014 GE_{59}	—	October 9, 1999	Kitt Peak	Spacewatch	·	2.6 km	MPC · JPL
578841	2014 GF_{61}	—	April 5, 2014	Haleakala	Pan-STARRS 1	·	3.0 km	MPC · JPL
578842	2014 GO_{61}	—	February 2, 2013	Mount Lemmon	Mount Lemmon Survey	·	2.8 km	MPC · JPL
578843	2014 GW_{61}	—	April 5, 2014	Haleakala	Pan-STARRS 1	·	2.2 km	MPC · JPL
578844	2014 GZ_{62}	—	January 10, 2013	Haleakala	Pan-STARRS 1	·	2.2 km	MPC · JPL
578845	2014 GM_{64}	—	January 15, 2007	Mauna Kea	P. A. Wiegert	·	1.6 km	MPC · JPL
578846	2014 GY_{64}	—	April 5, 2014	Haleakala	Pan-STARRS 1	·	510 m	MPC · JPL
578847	2014 GJ_{65}	—	April 8, 2014	Haleakala	Pan-STARRS 1	other TNO	183 km	MPC · JPL
578848	2014 GU_{65}	—	April 5, 2014	Haleakala	Pan-STARRS 1	·	2.7 km	MPC · JPL
578849	2014 GC_{70}	—	April 28, 2009	Kitt Peak	Spacewatch	·	1.6 km	MPC · JPL
578850	2014 GN_{74}	—	April 5, 2014	Haleakala	Pan-STARRS 1	·	2.5 km	MPC · JPL
578851	2014 GO_{74}	—	April 1, 2014	Kitt Peak	Spacewatch	·	480 m	MPC · JPL
578852	2014 GR_{74}	—	April 5, 2014	Haleakala	Pan-STARRS 1	·	2.8 km	MPC · JPL
578853	2014 GV_{75}	—	April 5, 2014	Haleakala	Pan-STARRS 1	·	2.3 km	MPC · JPL
578854	2014 GK_{76}	—	April 9, 2014	Haleakala	Pan-STARRS 1	·	2.7 km	MPC · JPL
578855	2014 GS_{76}	—	April 1, 2014	Mount Lemmon	Mount Lemmon Survey	VER	2.0 km	MPC · JPL
578856	2014 GU_{76}	—	April 9, 2014	Haleakala	Pan-STARRS 1	·	2.8 km	MPC · JPL
578857	2014 GX_{76}	—	April 5, 2014	Haleakala	Pan-STARRS 1	·	2.5 km	MPC · JPL
578858	2014 GZ_{76}	—	April 4, 2014	Haleakala	Pan-STARRS 1	·	2.5 km	MPC · JPL
578859	2014 GB_{77}	—	April 9, 2014	Mount Lemmon	Mount Lemmon Survey	·	2.7 km	MPC · JPL
578860	2014 GE_{77}	—	April 7, 2014	Mount Lemmon	Mount Lemmon Survey	·	2.6 km	MPC · JPL
578861	2014 GF_{77}	—	April 7, 2014	Mount Lemmon	Mount Lemmon Survey	·	2.6 km	MPC · JPL
578862	2014 GH_{77}	—	April 4, 2014	Haleakala	Pan-STARRS 1	·	2.3 km	MPC · JPL
578863	2014 GO_{77}	—	April 5, 2014	Haleakala	Pan-STARRS 1	·	2.5 km	MPC · JPL
578864	2014 GQ_{77}	—	April 5, 2014	Haleakala	Pan-STARRS 1	·	2.6 km	MPC · JPL
578865	2014 GT_{77}	—	April 9, 2014	Haleakala	Pan-STARRS 1	·	2.6 km	MPC · JPL
578866	2014 GH_{78}	—	April 2, 2014	Mount Lemmon	Mount Lemmon Survey	·	2.3 km	MPC · JPL
578867	2014 GE_{79}	—	April 5, 2014	Haleakala	Pan-STARRS 1	·	1.7 km	MPC · JPL
578868	2014 GE_{80}	—	April 5, 2014	Haleakala	Pan-STARRS 1	·	1.5 km	MPC · JPL
578869	2014 GU_{80}	—	April 5, 2014	Haleakala	Pan-STARRS 1	·	2.6 km	MPC · JPL
578870	2014 HU_{1}	—	April 5, 2014	Haleakala	Pan-STARRS 1	·	2.4 km	MPC · JPL
578871	2014 HY_{3}	—	April 5, 2014	Haleakala	Pan-STARRS 1	·	610 m	MPC · JPL
578872	2014 HR_{12}	—	March 23, 2014	Kitt Peak	Spacewatch	·	2.6 km	MPC · JPL
578873	2014 HM_{13}	—	April 21, 2014	Kitt Peak	Spacewatch	·	2.8 km	MPC · JPL
578874	2014 HR_{14}	—	October 22, 2012	Haleakala	Pan-STARRS 1	·	570 m	MPC · JPL
578875	2014 HH_{19}	—	April 1, 2014	Kitt Peak	Spacewatch	·	2.6 km	MPC · JPL
578876	2014 HE_{22}	—	October 22, 2012	Haleakala	Pan-STARRS 1	·	630 m	MPC · JPL
578877	2014 HD_{24}	—	September 5, 2008	Kitt Peak	Spacewatch	·	550 m	MPC · JPL
578878	2014 HF_{24}	—	April 22, 2014	Catalina	CSS	·	3.3 km	MPC · JPL
578879	2014 HR_{24}	—	October 24, 2011	Mount Lemmon	Mount Lemmon Survey	·	1.7 km	MPC · JPL
578880	2014 HD_{25}	—	June 28, 2011	Mount Lemmon	Mount Lemmon Survey	·	630 m	MPC · JPL
578881	2014 HH_{27}	—	April 23, 2014	Cerro Tololo-DECam	DECam	EOS	1.7 km	MPC · JPL
578882	2014 HJ_{28}	—	March 27, 2014	Haleakala	Pan-STARRS 1	EUN	880 m	MPC · JPL
578883	2014 HK_{28}	—	March 25, 2014	Kitt Peak	Spacewatch	·	530 m	MPC · JPL
578884	2014 HV_{29}	—	September 22, 2000	Kitt Peak	Spacewatch	·	3.0 km	MPC · JPL
578885	2014 HG_{30}	—	April 20, 2014	Mount Lemmon	Mount Lemmon Survey	·	2.4 km	MPC · JPL
578886	2014 HL_{31}	—	April 24, 2014	Mount Lemmon	Mount Lemmon Survey	·	2.8 km	MPC · JPL
578887	2014 HR_{32}	—	March 31, 2009	Mount Lemmon	Mount Lemmon Survey	·	1.4 km	MPC · JPL
578888	2014 HB_{34}	—	October 26, 2011	Haleakala	Pan-STARRS 1	·	3.1 km	MPC · JPL
578889	2014 HS_{35}	—	April 4, 2014	Haleakala	Pan-STARRS 1	·	810 m	MPC · JPL
578890	2014 HP_{37}	—	August 31, 2005	Kitt Peak	Spacewatch	·	2.4 km	MPC · JPL
578891	2014 HQ_{37}	—	February 8, 2007	Mount Lemmon	Mount Lemmon Survey	·	690 m	MPC · JPL
578892	2014 HQ_{39}	—	October 26, 2011	Haleakala	Pan-STARRS 1	VER	3.3 km	MPC · JPL
578893	2014 HT_{41}	—	October 1, 2005	Mount Lemmon	Mount Lemmon Survey	EOS	1.7 km	MPC · JPL
578894	2014 HO_{43}	—	November 18, 2011	Mount Lemmon	Mount Lemmon Survey	VER	2.1 km	MPC · JPL
578895	2014 HK_{50}	—	November 11, 1999	Kitt Peak	M. W. Buie, Kern, S. D.	·	720 m	MPC · JPL
578896	2014 HS_{50}	—	April 23, 2014	Cerro Tololo-DECam	DECam	EOS	1.8 km	MPC · JPL
578897	2014 HJ_{52}	—	September 25, 2006	Kitt Peak	Spacewatch	·	2.2 km	MPC · JPL
578898	2014 HQ_{55}	—	March 25, 2014	Kitt Peak	Spacewatch	·	550 m	MPC · JPL
578899	2014 HU_{61}	—	May 30, 2009	Mount Lemmon	Mount Lemmon Survey	·	1.8 km	MPC · JPL
578900	2014 HA_{69}	—	January 17, 2013	Haleakala	Pan-STARRS 1	·	1.4 km	MPC · JPL

== 578901–579000 ==
back to top

Designation			Discovery			Properties		Ref
Permanent	Provisional	Named after	Date	Site	Discoverer(s)	Category	Diam.	Ref
578901	2014 HC_{72}	—	March 25, 2014	Kitt Peak	Spacewatch	VER	2.7 km	MPC · JPL
578902	2014 HD_{73}	—	October 19, 2011	Mount Lemmon	Mount Lemmon Survey	·	1.5 km	MPC · JPL
578903	2014 HF_{73}	—	April 5, 2014	Haleakala	Pan-STARRS 1	·	630 m	MPC · JPL
578904	2014 HD_{79}	—	October 28, 2011	Kitt Peak	Spacewatch	·	2.2 km	MPC · JPL
578905	2014 HC_{80}	—	March 25, 2014	Kitt Peak	Spacewatch	·	530 m	MPC · JPL
578906	2014 HB_{81}	—	September 14, 2005	Kitt Peak	Spacewatch	EOS	1.6 km	MPC · JPL
578907	2014 HL_{81}	—	November 26, 2012	Mount Lemmon	Mount Lemmon Survey	·	590 m	MPC · JPL
578908	2014 HU_{81}	—	December 10, 2009	Mount Lemmon	Mount Lemmon Survey	·	550 m	MPC · JPL
578909	2014 HR_{82}	—	April 5, 2014	Haleakala	Pan-STARRS 1	VER	2.2 km	MPC · JPL
578910	2014 HA_{84}	—	October 25, 2011	Haleakala	Pan-STARRS 1	·	2.7 km	MPC · JPL
578911	2014 HL_{84}	—	March 29, 2014	Kitt Peak	Spacewatch	·	1.3 km	MPC · JPL
578912	2014 HQ_{87}	—	November 6, 2010	Mount Lemmon	Mount Lemmon Survey	·	2.2 km	MPC · JPL
578913	2014 HC_{89}	—	April 23, 2014	Cerro Tololo-DECam	DECam	·	2.0 km	MPC · JPL
578914	2014 HJ_{107}	—	April 23, 2014	Cerro Tololo-DECam	DECam	·	2.3 km	MPC · JPL
578915	2014 HP_{114}	—	August 31, 2005	Kitt Peak	Spacewatch	EOS	1.3 km	MPC · JPL
578916	2014 HT_{121}	—	December 27, 2006	Mount Lemmon	Mount Lemmon Survey	·	2.2 km	MPC · JPL
578917	2014 HP_{126}	—	August 31, 2005	Kitt Peak	Spacewatch	·	590 m	MPC · JPL
578918	2014 HE_{127}	—	September 15, 2010	Mount Lemmon	Mount Lemmon Survey	·	2.8 km	MPC · JPL
578919	2014 HX_{128}	—	March 25, 2003	Kitt Peak	Spacewatch	EOS	2.0 km	MPC · JPL
578920	2014 HK_{130}	—	April 23, 2014	Haleakala	Pan-STARRS 1	·	1.5 km	MPC · JPL
578921	2014 HR_{133}	—	November 12, 2005	Kitt Peak	Spacewatch	·	2.2 km	MPC · JPL
578922	2014 HQ_{136}	—	December 23, 2012	Haleakala	Pan-STARRS 1	·	540 m	MPC · JPL
578923	2014 HN_{139}	—	September 1, 2005	Kitt Peak	Spacewatch	·	2.2 km	MPC · JPL
578924	2014 HG_{142}	—	November 10, 1999	Kitt Peak	Spacewatch	·	3.2 km	MPC · JPL
578925	2014 HG_{143}	—	August 31, 2005	Kitt Peak	Spacewatch	·	2.0 km	MPC · JPL
578926	2014 HJ_{144}	—	December 24, 2012	Mount Lemmon	Mount Lemmon Survey	·	2.4 km	MPC · JPL
578927	2014 HA_{145}	—	April 9, 2003	Kitt Peak	Spacewatch	·	2.2 km	MPC · JPL
578928	2014 HT_{146}	—	April 8, 2014	Kitt Peak	Spacewatch	·	2.6 km	MPC · JPL
578929	2014 HL_{148}	—	October 24, 2011	Haleakala	Pan-STARRS 1	·	2.5 km	MPC · JPL
578930	2014 HQ_{148}	—	March 18, 2009	Kitt Peak	Spacewatch	·	1.7 km	MPC · JPL
578931	2014 HD_{149}	—	April 23, 2014	Cerro Tololo-DECam	DECam	·	1.2 km	MPC · JPL
578932	2014 HS_{150}	—	April 23, 2014	Cerro Tololo-DECam	DECam	TIR	2.9 km	MPC · JPL
578933	2014 HM_{151}	—	November 16, 2006	Kitt Peak	Spacewatch	·	3.0 km	MPC · JPL
578934	2014 HJ_{154}	—	April 14, 2008	Mount Lemmon	Mount Lemmon Survey	·	2.4 km	MPC · JPL
578935	2014 HS_{156}	—	March 6, 2008	Kitt Peak	Spacewatch	URS	3.0 km	MPC · JPL
578936	2014 HE_{161}	—	December 23, 2012	Haleakala	Pan-STARRS 1	·	2.2 km	MPC · JPL
578937	2014 HK_{162}	—	March 9, 2002	Kitt Peak	Spacewatch	VER	2.3 km	MPC · JPL
578938	2014 HC_{165}	—	December 8, 2012	Kitt Peak	Spacewatch	·	2.9 km	MPC · JPL
578939	2014 HV_{165}	—	April 23, 2009	Kitt Peak	Spacewatch	EOS	2.1 km	MPC · JPL
578940	2014 HB_{166}	—	September 24, 2011	Haleakala	Pan-STARRS 1	VER	2.1 km	MPC · JPL
578941	2014 HP_{166}	—	March 24, 2014	Haleakala	Pan-STARRS 1	·	1.5 km	MPC · JPL
578942	2014 HR_{166}	—	May 27, 2009	Mount Lemmon	Mount Lemmon Survey	EOS	2.1 km	MPC · JPL
578943	2014 HU_{166}	—	April 3, 2008	Kitt Peak	Spacewatch	(260)	2.9 km	MPC · JPL
578944	2014 HA_{167}	—	May 3, 2005	Kitt Peak	Spacewatch	·	2.2 km	MPC · JPL
578945	2014 HX_{167}	—	August 31, 2005	Kitt Peak	Spacewatch	·	2.7 km	MPC · JPL
578946	2014 HD_{168}	—	February 26, 2014	Haleakala	Pan-STARRS 1	EOS	1.8 km	MPC · JPL
578947	2014 HA_{170}	—	October 26, 2005	Kitt Peak	Spacewatch	HYG	3.0 km	MPC · JPL
578948	2014 HF_{171}	—	January 16, 2013	Haleakala	Pan-STARRS 1	·	2.4 km	MPC · JPL
578949	2014 HM_{172}	—	October 26, 2011	Haleakala	Pan-STARRS 1	·	2.6 km	MPC · JPL
578950	2014 HS_{172}	—	April 29, 2014	Haleakala	Pan-STARRS 1	·	1.5 km	MPC · JPL
578951	2014 HT_{172}	—	April 29, 2014	Haleakala	Pan-STARRS 1	·	2.3 km	MPC · JPL
578952	2014 HW_{174}	—	April 29, 2014	Haleakala	Pan-STARRS 1	·	2.6 km	MPC · JPL
578953	2014 HQ_{175}	—	February 18, 2008	Mount Lemmon	Mount Lemmon Survey	EOS	1.7 km	MPC · JPL
578954	2014 HE_{179}	—	July 25, 2011	Haleakala	Pan-STARRS 1	·	540 m	MPC · JPL
578955	2014 HF_{189}	—	April 30, 2014	Haleakala	Pan-STARRS 1	URS	2.4 km	MPC · JPL
578956	2014 HC_{191}	—	April 29, 2014	Haleakala	Pan-STARRS 1	·	2.7 km	MPC · JPL
578957	2014 HJ_{192}	—	April 5, 2014	Haleakala	Pan-STARRS 1	·	2.5 km	MPC · JPL
578958	2014 HG_{207}	—	April 30, 2014	Haleakala	Pan-STARRS 1	·	2.6 km	MPC · JPL
578959	2014 HH_{211}	—	January 28, 2007	Mount Lemmon	Mount Lemmon Survey	·	510 m	MPC · JPL
578960	2014 HE_{218}	—	April 30, 2014	Haleakala	Pan-STARRS 1	·	2.4 km	MPC · JPL
578961	2014 HC_{220}	—	April 29, 2014	Haleakala	Pan-STARRS 1	·	2.3 km	MPC · JPL
578962	2014 HU_{220}	—	April 23, 2014	Haleakala	Pan-STARRS 1	·	2.4 km	MPC · JPL
578963	2014 HB_{221}	—	April 30, 2014	Haleakala	Pan-STARRS 1	·	2.2 km	MPC · JPL
578964	2014 HD_{222}	—	April 29, 2014	Haleakala	Pan-STARRS 1	·	2.9 km	MPC · JPL
578965	2014 HE_{222}	—	April 29, 2014	Haleakala	Pan-STARRS 1	VER	2.4 km	MPC · JPL
578966	2014 HV_{222}	—	April 21, 2014	Mount Lemmon	Mount Lemmon Survey	·	2.6 km	MPC · JPL
578967	2014 HH_{223}	—	April 29, 2014	Haleakala	Pan-STARRS 1	·	2.6 km	MPC · JPL
578968	2014 JF	—	May 1, 2014	ESA OGS	ESA OGS	URS	3.0 km	MPC · JPL
578969	2014 JA_{2}	—	October 18, 2012	Haleakala	Pan-STARRS 1	·	650 m	MPC · JPL
578970	2014 JS_{3}	—	March 9, 2014	Haleakala	Pan-STARRS 1	·	2.4 km	MPC · JPL
578971	2014 JG_{5}	—	September 23, 2008	Mount Lemmon	Mount Lemmon Survey	·	540 m	MPC · JPL
578972	2014 JX_{5}	—	April 4, 2014	Haleakala	Pan-STARRS 1	·	1.9 km	MPC · JPL
578973	2014 JZ_{11}	—	December 24, 2006	Kitt Peak	Spacewatch	TIR	2.9 km	MPC · JPL
578974	2014 JM_{17}	—	October 28, 2006	Mount Lemmon	Mount Lemmon Survey	THM	2.0 km	MPC · JPL
578975	2014 JA_{18}	—	April 20, 2009	Kitt Peak	Spacewatch	EOS	1.8 km	MPC · JPL
578976	2014 JL_{27}	—	May 4, 2014	Haleakala	Pan-STARRS 1	·	1.5 km	MPC · JPL
578977	2014 JM_{27}	—	February 28, 2014	Haleakala	Pan-STARRS 1	·	3.6 km	MPC · JPL
578978	2014 JZ_{28}	—	May 5, 2014	Mount Lemmon	Mount Lemmon Survey	·	570 m	MPC · JPL
578979	2014 JH_{31}	—	March 5, 2013	Haleakala	Pan-STARRS 1	·	2.8 km	MPC · JPL
578980	2014 JP_{32}	—	January 17, 2007	Kitt Peak	Spacewatch	URS	3.2 km	MPC · JPL
578981	2014 JO_{38}	—	May 4, 2014	Haleakala	Pan-STARRS 1	·	2.3 km	MPC · JPL
578982	2014 JR_{40}	—	November 27, 2011	Mount Lemmon	Mount Lemmon Survey	VER	2.6 km	MPC · JPL
578983	2014 JL_{41}	—	April 30, 2014	Haleakala	Pan-STARRS 1	·	2.8 km	MPC · JPL
578984	2014 JF_{43}	—	April 25, 2007	Kitt Peak	Spacewatch	(2076)	720 m	MPC · JPL
578985	2014 JS_{43}	—	July 29, 2005	Palomar	NEAT	·	2.4 km	MPC · JPL
578986	2014 JK_{48}	—	May 6, 2014	Haleakala	Pan-STARRS 1	·	490 m	MPC · JPL
578987	2014 JR_{51}	—	April 11, 2005	Mount Lemmon	Mount Lemmon Survey	·	1.7 km	MPC · JPL
578988	2014 JX_{53}	—	April 30, 2014	Haleakala	Pan-STARRS 1	·	630 m	MPC · JPL
578989	2014 JD_{55}	—	April 29, 2014	ESA OGS	ESA OGS	H	390 m	MPC · JPL
578990	2014 JX_{58}	—	April 8, 2014	Mount Lemmon	Mount Lemmon Survey	·	3.0 km	MPC · JPL
578991	2014 JC_{80}	—	February 1, 2005	Kitt Peak	Spacewatch	centaur	30 km	MPC · JPL
578992	2014 JL_{80}	—	May 4, 2014	Haleakala	Pan-STARRS 1	plutino	163 km	MPC · JPL
578993	2014 JP_{80}	—	May 7, 2014	Haleakala	Pan-STARRS 1	plutino · fast	480 km	MPC · JPL
578994	2014 JA_{83}	—	May 6, 2014	Haleakala	Pan-STARRS 1	·	1.2 km	MPC · JPL
578995	2014 JQ_{85}	—	November 18, 2007	Kitt Peak	Spacewatch	·	3.4 km	MPC · JPL
578996	2014 JV_{85}	—	May 6, 2014	Haleakala	Pan-STARRS 1	·	2.4 km	MPC · JPL
578997	2014 JR_{92}	—	May 9, 2014	Haleakala	Pan-STARRS 1	centaur	144 km	MPC · JPL
578998	2014 JT_{92}	—	September 6, 2016	Haleakala	Pan-STARRS 1	TIR	2.5 km	MPC · JPL
578999	2014 JJ_{93}	—	June 27, 2015	Haleakala	Pan-STARRS 1	(1118)	2.6 km	MPC · JPL
579000	2014 JP_{94}	—	May 8, 2014	Haleakala	Pan-STARRS 1	·	480 m	MPC · JPL

back to top

== Meaning of names ==
As minor planet discoveries are confirmed, they are given a permanent number by the IAU's Minor Planet Center (MPC), and the discoverers can then submit names for them, following the IAU's naming conventions. The list below concerns those minor planets in the specified number-range that have received names, and explains the meanings of those names.

Official naming citations of newly named small Solar System bodies are approved and published in a bulletin by IAU's Working Group for Small Bodies Nomenclature (WGSBN). Before May 2021, citations were published in MPC's Minor Planet Circulars for many decades. Recent citations can also be found on the JPL Small-Body Database (SBDB). Until his death in 2016, German astronomer Lutz D. Schmadel compiled these citations into the Dictionary of Minor Planet Names (DMP) and regularly updated the collection.

Based on Paul Herget's The Names of the Minor Planets, Schmadel also researched the unclear origin of numerous asteroids, most of which had been named prior to World War II. This article incorporates text from this source, which is in the public domain: SBDB New namings may only be added to this list below after official publication as the preannouncement of names is condemned. The WGSBN publishes a comprehensive guideline for the naming rules of non-cometary small Solar System bodies.

Named minor planet	Provisional	This minor planet was named for...	Ref · Catalog
578053 Jordillorca	2013 WD_{1}	Jordi Llorca Piqué (born 1966) is a Spanish chemist and professor at the Polytechnic University of Catalonia (BarcelonaTech). He was a meteoricist at UMN's Institute of Meteoritics in New Mexico, and founded a citizen scientist group which recovered hundreds of meteorites (Src, Src)	IAU · 578053
578164 Rerrichbéla	2013 XO	Béla Rerrich (1881–1932), a Hungarian architect and landscape designer, known for new ways of designing public green spaces and for his building complex around Dóm Square in Szeged town.	IAU · 578164
578168 Miaochangwen	2013 XS_{4}	Miao Changwen (b. 1957), an expert in the field of building materials and an academician of the Chinese Academy of Engineering.	IAU · 578168
578202 Philippetalbot	2013 YX_{18}	Philippe Talbot (born 1979), French tenor performing operas and operettas.	IAU · 578202
578249 Josephcarr	2013 YY_{81}	Joseph Carr, Canadian amateur astronomer and long-term member of the Victoria chapter of the Royal Astronomical Society of Canada.	IAU · 578249
578622 Fergezsuzsa	2014 EN_{17}	Zsuzsa Ferge (1931–2024), a Hungarian economist, who worked in the fields of social statistics, sociology, and social policy.	IAU · 578622
