= List of members of the Trilateral Commission =

This is a list of members of the Trilateral Commission.

== Leadership positions ==
Position	European Group	North American Group	Asia Pacific Group
Chair	Axel A. Weber	Meghan O'Sullivan	Takeshi Niinami
Deputy Chairs	Monica Maggioni Carl Bildt	Herminio Blanco Mendoza Jeffrey Simpson	Barry Desker Jin Roy Ryu
Honorary Chairs	Georges Berthoin Mario Monti Jean-Claude Trichet Peter Sutherland (in memorium)	Paul Volcker (in memorium)	Yasuchika Hasegawa Akihiko Tanaka
Director	Paolo Magri	Richard Fontaine	Hideko Katsumata
Founder	David Rockefeller (in memorium)		

== Membership by country ==
Country	Leadership	Executive Committee	Members	Fellows	Total
European Group	7			15	
Czech Republic				1	
Denmark				1	
France	2			1	
Germany	1			1	
Greece				1	
Italy	3			4	
Netherlands				1	
Serbia				1	
Spain				1	
Sweden	1			1	
Switzerland				1	
United Kingdom				1	
North American Group	4			17	
Canada	1			3	
Mexico	1			2	
United States	2			12	
Asia Pacific Group	6			7	
India				1	
Japan	5			4	
Singapore	1				
South Korea				2	
Global members			15	1	16
Iran			1		1
Israel			1		1
Kuwait			1		1
Lebanon			3		3
Morocco			1		1
Russia			2		2
South Africa			1		1
Tunisia			2		2
Turkey			2	1 (Note: The condition for David Rockefeller Fellowships is that the recipient must be a citizen or permanent resident of a country in the region awarding the Fellowship. In the case of Levent Tuzun, he is likely a permanent resident in a European country.)	3
United Arab Emirates			1		1
Total	17			39	

== Current list of members ==
The following is a list of members of the commission as of August 2022. Members may hold further positions and/or former positions than are reflected below, but these are not captured in the commission's membership directory.

=== European Group ===
Name	Country	Position(s)	Former Position(s)
Ann-Kristin Achleitner	Germany	Scientific Director, Center for Entrepreneurial and Financial Studies, Technical University of Munich	
Peter Andronov	Bulgaria	chief executive officer of International Markets and Member in charge of Bulgaria, Hungary, Slovakia, Ireland, and KBC Group Asset Management, Group Executive Committee, KBC Group	
Vyara Ankova	Bulgaria	Executive Director, Nova Broadcasting Group	
Jacques Aschenbroich	France	Chairman, board of directors, Valeo	
Estela Barbot	Portugal	Member, Board & Audit Committee, Redes Energéticas Nacionais President, General Council, NOVA University Lisbon	Director, Santander Bank Member, Board & Audit Committee, Financial Institution for Development, Portugal
Ornella Barra	United Kingdom	chief operating officer, Walgreens Boots Alliance	
Ladislav Bartoníček	Czech Republic	chief executive officer, Sotio Shareholder, PPF Group	
Oliver Bäte	Germany	chief executive officer, Allianz	
Marek Belka	Poland	Member of the European Parliament	President, National Bank of Poland Prime Minister of Poland Deputy Prime Minister of Poland Minister of Finance of Poland
Dick Benschop	Netherlands	President and chief executive officer, Royal Schiphol Group	Deputy Minister of Foreign Affairs of the Netherlands
Georges Berthoin	France	International Honorary chairman, European Movement Honorary chairman, The Jean Monnet Association	
Alexia Bertrand	Belgium	Member of the Parliament of the Brussels-Capital Region Member of the Parliament of the French Community Chair, Parliamentary Group, Reformist Movement	Chief of Staff to the Deputy Prime Minister of Belgium
Laurent Bigorgne	France	Director, Institut Montaigne	
Carl Bildt	Sweden	Special Envoy for Access to COVID-19 Tools Accelerator, World Health Organization Co-chair, European Council on Foreign Relations	Minister for Foreign Affairs of Sweden Member of Parliament in the Riksdag Chairman, Moderate Party Prime Minister of Sweden High Representative for Bosnia and Herzegovina, European Union Special Envoy to the Balkans, United Nations
Franjo Bobinac	Slovenia	President, Management Board, Gorenje Group Vice President for Marketing, Hisense International Co. Ltd. Honorary Consul of Monaco in Ljubljana	
Sophie Boissard	France	chief executive officer, Korian Group	
Stéphane Boujnah	France	chief executive officer, Euronext Group	
Jean-Louis Bourlanges	France	Associated Professor, Paris Institute of Political Studies	Member, Cour des Comptes Member of the European Parliament President, European Movement in France
Katharine Braddick	United Kingdom	Group Head of Strategic Policy and Senior Advisor to the chief executive officer, Barclays	
Dame Nicola Brewer	United Kingdom	Non-Executive board member, Iberdrola Non-Executive board member, Aggreko	Vice Provost, University College London British High Commissioner to South Africa
Samir Brikho	United Kingdom		chief executive officer, Amec Foster Wheeler
John Bruton	Ireland		Taoiseach European Union Ambassador to the United States
Rolf Buch	Germany	chief executive officer, Vonovia	
Patrick Buffet	France	Chairman, P.B.A. Sas Member, French Academy of Technologies	Chairman and chief executive officer, Eramet
François Bujon de l'Estang	France	Chairman, FBE International Consultants	Chairman, Citibank France French Ambassador to the United States
Luis de Carlos	Spain	Managing Partner, Uría Menéndez Abogados	
Jaime Castellanos	Spain	Chairman, Lazard Spain Chairman, Willis Towers Watson Iberia	
João Castello Branco	Portugal	chief executive officer, Semapa	
Pedro Castro e Almeida	Portugal	Executive chairman, Santander Bank Portugal	
Heinrich Christen	Switzerland	Partner, BLR & Partners AG	Managing Partner for Switzerland and Liechtenstein, Ernst & Young
Patrick Combes	France	Chairman and chief executive officer, Compagnie Financière Tradition Chairman and chief executive officer, VIEL & cie	
Richard Conroy	Ireland	Chairman, Conroy Gold and Natural Resources	Member of the Seanad Éireann
Michele Crisostomo	Italy	Chairman, Enel	
Enrico Tommaso Cucchiani	Italy	Founding Partner and chief executive officer, Think Global Investments London	Group chief executive officer, Intesa Sanpaolo
Caroline Daniel	United Kingdom	Partner, Brunswick Group	Editor, FT Weekend, Financial Times
Yves-Louis Darricarrère	France	Senior Advisor, Lazard Frères Bank Senior Lecturer in Energy Geopolitics, Paris Institute of Political Studies	Member, Executive Committee, TotalEnergies chief executive officer, TotalEnergies Upstream chief executive officer, TotalEnergies Exploration and Production chief executive officer, TotalEnergies Gas & Power
Marta Dassù	Italy	Senior Director of European Affairs, Aspen Institute Editor-in-Chief, Aspenia, Aspen Institute Italia	Vice Minister for Foreign Affairs of Italy
Michel David-Weill (Note: Michel David-Weill died on 16 June 2022 at the age of 89.)	France		Chairman, Lazard LLC Chairman, Supervisory Board, Eurazeo
Thierry Déau	France	Founding Partner and chief executive officer, Meridiam Infrastructure	
Marie-Ange Debon	France	Chairwoman, Executive Board, Keolis Group	Senior Executive Vice President in charge of France, Italy, and Central Europe, Suez Group
Matteo Del Fante	Italy	chief executive officer and managing director, Poste Italiane	
Anna Diamantopoulou	Greece	President, DIKTIO—Network for Reform in Greece and Europe	European Commissioner for Employment, Social Affairs, and Equal Opportunities Minister of Development, Competitiveness and Shipping of Greece Minister of Education, Research and Technology, and Lifelong Learning of Greece
Admiral Giampaolo Di Paola	Italy		Minister of Defence of Italy Chairman, Military Committee, NATO
Vladimír Dlouhý	Czech Republic	President, Czech Chamber of Commerce International Advisor, Goldman Sachs	Minister of Economy of Czechoslovakia Minister of Industry and Trade of the Czech Republic
Rolf Dörig	Switzerland	Chairman, Swiss Life Chairman, The Adecco Group	
Ivana Dragičević	Croatia	Executive Producer for International News, N1 Affiliate for Adria region, CNN	
Aleksandra Drecun	Serbia	Director, INTERSECTION – Centre for Science and Innovation President, Harvard Club of Serbia Co-chair, Women's Government of Serbia	
Karsten Dybvad	Denmark	Chairman, Danske Bank	Director-General and chief executive officer, Confederation of Danish Industry
Jakob Ellemann-Jensen	Denmark	Chairman, Danish Liberal Party	
Guy Elliott	United Kingdom	Deputy chairman, SABMiller plc non-executive director, Royal Dutch Shell plc	chief financial officer, Rio Tinto
Manuel Falcó	Spain	Global Co-Head of Banking, Capital Markets, and Advisory, Citigroup	
Javier Faus	Spain	Chairman, Meridia Capital Partners	
Lucía Figar	Spain	Chief of Corporate Innovation, IE University	
Jürgen Fitschen	Germany	Senior Advisor, Deutsche Bank AG	chief executive officer, Deutsche Bank AG President, Association of German Banks Chairman, Supervisory Board, Ceconomy AG
Mark FitzPatrick	United Kingdom	chief financial officer and chief operating officer, Prudential	
Seamus FitzPatrick	United Kingdom	Co-founder, chief executive officer, and Managing Partner, CapVest Associates	
Simon Freakley	United Kingdom	chief executive officer, AlixPartners	
Louise Fresco	Netherlands	President, Executive Board, Wageningen University & Research	Member, Board of non-executive directors, Unilever Member, Supervisory Board, Rabobank Assistant Director-General and Head, Agriculture Department, Food and Agriculture Organization
Luc Frieden	Luxembourg	Chairman, board of directors, Banque Internationale à Luxembourg Chairman, Board, Saint-Paul Luxembourg	Minister for Finances of Luxembourg Minister for Defence of Luxembourg Minister for Justice of Luxembourg
Hugh Friel	Ireland		chief executive officer, Kerry Group plc chairman, Tourism Ireland
Uwe Fröhlich	Germany	Co-chief executive officer, DZ Bank	
Michael Fuchs	Germany		Member of the German Bundestag Deputy chairman, CDU/CSU Parliamentary Group President, National Federation of German Wholesale & Foreign Trade
Sigmar Gabriel	Germany	Chairman, Atlantik-Brücke	Member of the German Bundestag Federal Minister of Foreign Affairs of Germany
Cristina Garmendia	Spain	Chair, SILO Chair, Cotec Foundation Member, Supervisory Board, SYGNIS	Minister of Science and Innovation of Spain
Ignacio Garralda	Spain	Chairman, Mutua Madrileña	
Nicoletta Giadrossi	Italy	Chairman, Italian State Railways	
Brian Gilvary	United Kingdom	non-executive director, Barclays plc non-executive director, Air Liquide	
Elena Goitini	Italy	chief executive officer, BNL-BNP Paribas Group	
Sinead Gorman	Netherlands	Executive Vice President for Finance, Integrated Gas, and New Energies, Shell International Exploration and Production	
Sylwia Gregorczyk-Abram	Poland	Advocate and Head of the Public Interest, Strategic Litigation, and Social Responsibility of Lawyers Program, Clifford Chance	
Angelos Gregoriades	Cyprus	Non-Executive board member, Central Bank of Cyprus Honorary Consul of Slovakia in Nicosia Business Consultant, KPMG	Chairman, KMPG Cyprus
Vittorio Grilli	Italy	Chairman for Italy, JPMorgan Chase Chairman for Europe, the Middle East, and Africa, Corporate & Investment Bank, JP Morgan Chase	Minister of Economics and Finance of Italy
Élisabeth Guigou	France	President, Anna Lindh Foundation	Member of the French National Assembly Chair, Foreign Affairs Committee, French National Assembly Minister for European Affairs of France
Christian Gut	Spain	chief executive officer, Prosegur	
Håkon Haugli	Norway	chief executive officer, Innovation Norway	Member of the Storting
Anniken Hauglie	Norway	Political Director and Deputy managing director, Confederation of Norwegian Enterprise	Director-General, Norwegian Oil and Gas Association Minister of Labour and Social Inclusion of Norway
Beat Hess	Switzerland	Chairman, Board, Holcim Ltd.	
Nigel Higgins	United Kingdom	Chairman, Barclays plc	
Gerda Holzinger-Burgstaller	Austria	chief executive officer, Erste Group Bank	
Alexandra de Hoop Scheffer	Netherlands	Senior Transatlantic Fellow and director, Paris Office, German Marshall Fund Head, Transatlantic Security Task Force, German Marshall Fund	
Dame Vivian Hunt	United Kingdom	Managing Partner, McKinsey & Company	
Toomas Hendrik Ilves	Estonia		President of Estonia
Michael J. Inacker	Germany	chief executive officer and chairman, Board, WMP Eurocom	
Mugur Isărescu	Romania	Governor of the National Bank of Romania	Prime Minister of Romania
Renée Jones-Bos	Netherlands	Chair, Supervisory Committee, Dutch Intelligence Services	Ambassador of the Netherlands to Russia Ambassador of the Netherlands to the United States
Rastislav Káčer	Slovakia	Minister of Foreign and European Affairs of Slovakia (Note: Rastislav Káčer assumed the office of Minister of Foreign and European Affairs of Slovakia on 13 September 2022.) Chairman, GLOBSEC	Ambassador of Slovakia to the United States
Sylvie Kauffmann	France	Editorial Director and Foreign Affairs Columnist, Le Monde Contributing Writer, The New York Times	
Piia-Noora Kauppi	Finland	chief executive officer, Finance Finland	
Yasmine Kherbache	Belgium	Judge, Belgian Constitutional Court	Member of the Belgian Federal Parliament Chief of Staff to the Prime Minister of Belgium
Kasia Kieli	Poland	President and managing director, Discovery Europe, Middle East and Africa	
Roderich Kiesewetter	Germany	Member of the German Bundestag	
Sir John Kingman	United Kingdom	Chairman, Legal & General Group plc Chair, UK Research and Innovation	
Klaas Knot	Netherlands	President, De Nederlandsche Bank	
Jovan Kovačić	Serbia	President, East-West Bridge chief executive officer, GCA Global Communications Associates Ltd. chief executive officer, Henderson Asset Protection	Advisor to the Government of Serbia
Kovács Árpád	Hungary	Chairman, Fiscal Council of Hungary Professor, University of Szeged	President, State Audit Office of Hungary
Gábor Kovács	Hungary	Chairman and chief executive officer, Bankár Holding Founder, Kovács Gábor Art Foundation	
Jerzy Koźmiński	Poland	President and chief executive officer, Polish-American Freedom Foundation	Ambassador of Poland to the United States First Deputy Minister of Foreign Affairs of Poland
Idar Kreutzer	Norway	chief executive officer, Finance Norway	
Francisco de Lacerda	Portugal	Chairman, Banco CTT	chief executive officer, CTT Correios de Portugal, S.A.

=== Global members ===
Global members are appointed from countries that do not fall within the scope of any of the three regional groups, particularly Africa, Eastern Europe, and the Middle East. They attend the commission's annual plenary meetings, but not the regional meetings.

Name	Country	Position(s)	Former Position(s)
Fouad Mohammed Thunayan Al-Ghanim	Kuwait	Chairman, Fouad Alghanim & Sons Group of Companies	
Ahmed Aljarwan	United Arab Emirates	President, Global Council for Tolerance and Peace President, General Union of Arab Experts President, Foundation for Islamic Culture & Religious Tolerance (FICRT) President, Paris Peace Forum	President, Arab Parliament
Alain Bifani	Lebanon		Director-General, Ministry of Finance of Lebanon
Ouided Bouchamaoui	Tunisia	Nobel Peace Prize Laureate (2015)	President, Tunisian Confederation of Industry, Trade and Handicrafts
Youssef Chahed	Tunisia		Prime Minister of Tunisia
Bülent Eczacıbaşı	Turkey	Chairman, Board, Eczacıbaşı Holding	
Karim El Aynaoui	Morocco	Executive President, Policy Center for the New South Executive Vice-president, Mohammed VI Polytechnic University Dean, Faculty of Governance, Economics, and Social Sciences, Mohammed VI Polytechnic University	
Jacob A. Frenkel	Israel	Chairman, Board of Trustees, Group of Thirty Chairman, Frenkel- Zuckerman Institute for Global Economics	Chairman, JPMorgan Chase International Governor, Bank of Israel Chief Economist of the International Monetary Fund
Sergei Guriev	Russia	Professor of Economics and Director of Graduate Programmes in Economics, Paris Institute of Political Studies	
Maryam Khansari	Iran	general manager, Herison Construction Company International Relations Manager, Iran Association of Construction Companies	
Mmusi Maimane	South Africa	Founder, Build One South Africa	Federal Leader, Democratic Alliance
Fouad Makhzoumi	Lebanon	Chairman, Future Group Executive chairman and chief executive officer, Future Pipe Industries	
Güler Sabancı	Turkey	Chairman, Hacı Ömer Sabancı Holding A.Ş.	
Maha Yahya	Lebanon	Director, The Malcolm H. Kerr Carnegie Middle East Center	
Igor Yurgens	Russia	Chairman, Management Board, Institute of Contemporary Development	

== Former members in public service ==
To help preserve the commission's unofficial charter, members who enter in government roles must relinquish their membership.

Name	Country	Regional Group	Position(s)
Antony Blinken	United States	North America	Secretary of State of the United States
Lael Brainard	United States	North America	Vice Chair of the Federal Reserve of the United States Member of the Federal Reserve Board of Governors of the United States
Mark Brzezinski	United States	North America	Ambassador of the United States to Poland
R. Nicholas Burns	United States	North America	Ambassador of the United States to China
Anna Ekström	Sweden	Europe	Former Minister for Education of Sweden (Note: Anna Ekström's term as Swedish Minister for Education ended on 17 October 2022.)
Mette Frederiksen	Denmark	Europe	Prime Minister of Denmark
S. Jaishankar	India	Asia Pacific	Minister of External Affairs of India
Kenneth I. Juster	United States	North America	Former Ambassador of the United States to India
Yuko Kawamoto	Japan	Asia Pacific	President of the Japanese National Personnel Authority
David Lipton	United States	North America	First Deputy managing director of the International Monetary Fund
Na Kyung-won	South Korea	Asia Pacific	Member of the National Assembly of the Republic of Korea
Ong Keng Yong	Singapore	Asia Pacific	Ambassador-at-large, Ministry of Foreign Affairs of Singapore Executive Deputy chairman, S. Rajaratnam School of International Studies, Nanyang Technological University
Wendy Sherman	United States	North America	Deputy Secretary of State of the United States
Sir Keir Starmer	United Kingdom	Europe	Member of the British Parliament Leader of the British Labour Party Current Prime Minister
Jake Sullivan	United States	North America	National Security Advisor of the United States
Elsbeth Tronstad	Norway	Europe	State Secretary, Ministry of Foreign Affairs of Norway
Margrethe Vestager	Denmark	Europe	Executive Vice President of the European Commission for A Europe Fit for the Digital Age European Commissioner for Competition

== David Rockefeller Fellows ==
Since 2013, each of the regional groups has granted David Rockefeller Fellowships to individuals from countries under their jurisdiction. Fellows are appointed for three-year terms, and are expected to attend at both annual plenary and regional meetings.

Name	Country	Regional Group	Position(s)
Ahmed Abdirahman	Sweden	Europe	Founder and chief executive officer, Global Village Foundation Barack Obama Foundation Leader
Ravipal Bains	Canada	North America	Senior Associate, McMillan LLP
Alesha Black	United States	North America	Director, Global Food and Agriculture Programme, Chicago Council on Global Affairs
David Borcsok	Canada	North America	chief executive officer, Ordinary
Cecilia Braggiotti	Italy	Europe	general manager for Italy and Global Business Development, Afiniti
Jessica Brandt	United States	North America	Fellow and Head of Research and Policy, Alliance for Securing Democracy
Edoardo Campanella	Italy	Europe	Senior Global Economist, UniCredit Senior Fellow, Mossavar-Rahmani Center for Business and Government, Harvard Kennedy School
Nihal Chauhan	India	Asia Pacific	Deputy Lead (Policy), Google India
Stefano Gandolfo	Greece	Europe	Ertegun Scholar and PhD Candidate, Oxford University
Marta Guzzafame	Spain	Europe	Principal, Boston Consulting Group
Nina Christina Halg	Switzerland	Europe	Programme Officer (Multilateral Affairs), Federal Department of Foreign Affairs of Switzerland
Yohei Kiguchi	Japan	Asia Pacific	Founder and chief executive officer, ENECHANGE Group
Kim Gunho	South Korea	Asia Pacific	Vice President, Corporate Development Performance Unit, Samyang Holdings Corporation
Takuya Kitagawa	Japan	Asia Pacific	Chief Data Officer and Managing Executive Officer, Rakuten Group, Inc.
Mia Kovačić	Serbia	Europe	Marketing and Public Relations Director, CWP Global, PostScriptum Energy
Javier Paul Itchon Lao	Japan	Asia Pacific	Analyst, Global Markets Division, Goldman Sachs
Elisa Lavore	United States	North America	Gender Equality and Social Inclusion Lead, Skills for Prosperity Initiative, Development Alternatives Inc.
Jessica Ji Eun Lee	United States	North America	Senior Research Fellow for East Asia, Quincy Institute for Responsible Statecraft
Laura McGee	Canada	North America	Founder and chief executive officer, Diversio
Silvia Merler	Italy	Europe	Head of Research, Algebris Policy & Research Forum
Tzitzi Moran	Mexico	North America	Consultant, Inter-American Development Bank
Ana Janaina Nelson	United States	North America	Latin America Lead, Amazon Web Services Institute
Annahita Nikpour	Denmark	Europe	Advisor to the Secretary-General, Oxfam IBIS
Christian Nordholtz	Germany	Europe	Lawyer and Equity Partner, KPMG Law Shareholder, KPMG AG
Park Jaehan	South Korea	Asia Pacific	Predoctoral Fellow, The William P. Clements Jr. Center for National Security, University of Texas at Austin
Roxanne Petraeus	United States	North America	Co-founder and chief executive officer, Ethena
Dita Přikrylová	Czech Republic	Europe	Social Entrepreneur, director, and Founder, Czechitas Member, Advisory Board, Cesko Digital and Social Impact Award International
Jacobo Roa-Vicens	United Kingdom	Europe	Machine Learning Centre of Excellence, JPMorgan Chase Centre for Computational Statistics and Machine Learning, University College London
Zita Schellekens	Netherlands	Europe	Social entrepreneur and advisor on purpose and impact leadership
Loren DeJonge Schulman	United States	North America	Deputy Director of Studies and Leon E. Panetta Senior Fellow, Center for a New American Security
Ludovic Subran	France	Europe	Head of Macroeconomic Research, Allianz
Andrew Sweet	United States	North America	Associate Partner, Dalberg Global Development Advisors
Yurina Takiguchi	Japan	Asia Pacific	Anchor, Nikkei CNBC Editor and Communication Director, Forbes
Pablo Tortolero	Mexico	North America	Technology policy, security, and FinTech
Levent Tuzun	Turkey	Europe	Principal Economist, European Bank for Reconstruction and Development
Matteo Villa	Italy	Europe	Research Fellow, Institute for International Political Studies
Samantha Vinograd	United States	North America	Public Policy Lead, Stripe, Inc.
Joshua W. Walker	United States	North America	President and chief executive officer, Japan Society
Ali Wyne	United States	North America	Senior Analyst for Global Macro, Eurasia Group
Ammanuel Zegeye	United States	North America	Partner, McKinsey & Company
