= EYV =

EYV may refer to:

- European Year of Volunteering, a follow-up to the International Year of Volunteers
- EYV 2011 Alliance, a winner of the European Citizen's Prize
- EYV, abbreviation for Israeli basketball team Elitzur Yavne B.C.
