= Ruivo =

Ruivo is a Portuguese surname. Notable people with the surname include:

- Catarina Ruivo (born 1971), Portuguese film director
- Mário Ruivo (1927–2017), Portuguese scientist and politician

== See also ==
- Cabo Ruivo (Lisbon Metro), metro station in Lisbon, Portugal
- Pico Ruivo, mountain in Madeira, Portugal
