= Soufi (surname) =

Soufi is a surname. Notable people with this surname include:

- Ali Soufi, Iranian reformist politician
- Mahmoud Soufi (1971–2019), Qatari footballer
- Muhammad Soufi (1927–2018), former field marshal in the Syrian Army
- Nawal Soufi (born 1988), Moroccan-Italian social worker and human rights activist
