= Zsuzsa Ferge =

Hungarian sociologist and statistician (died 2024)

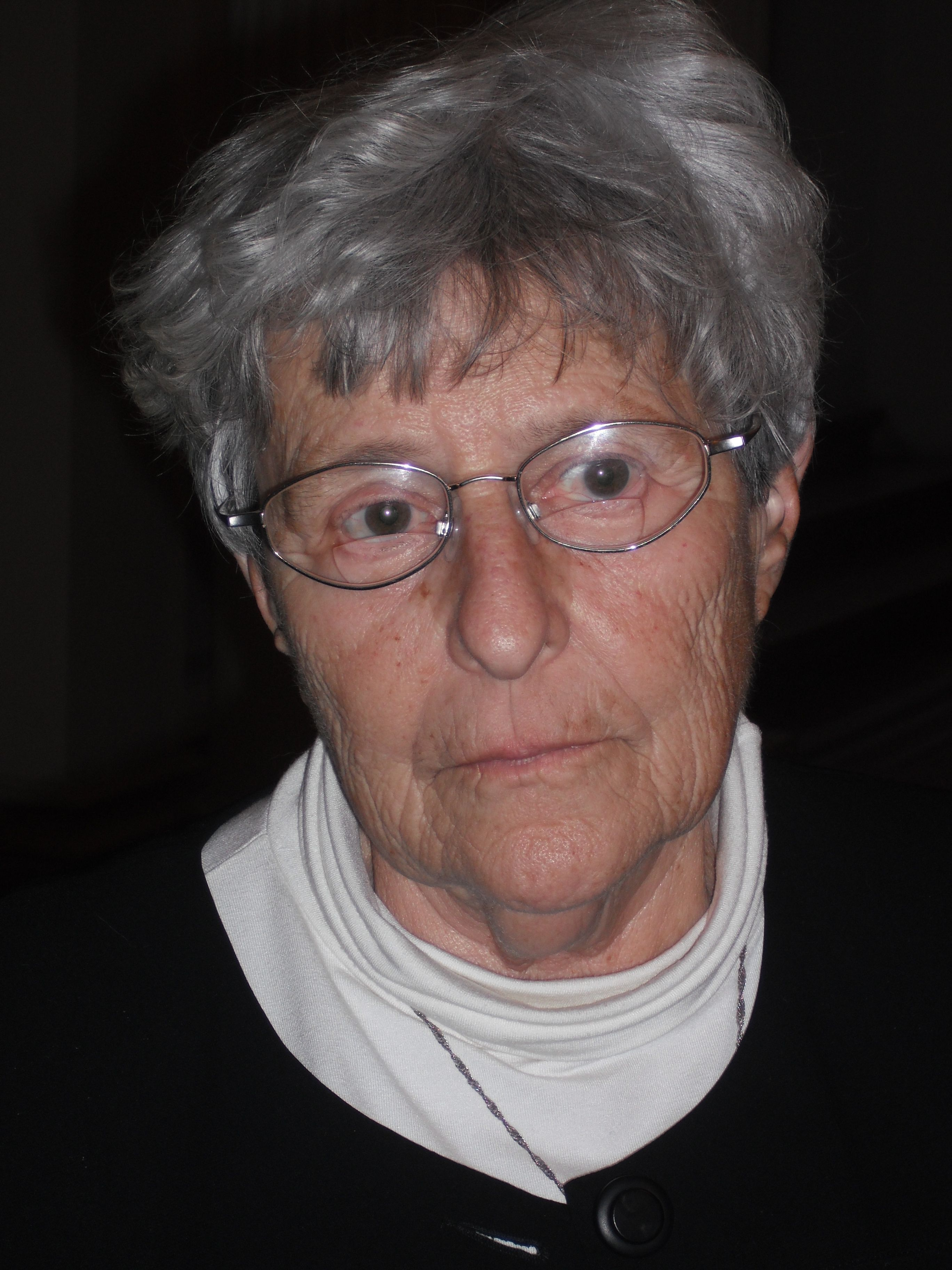
- Born: 25 April 1931; Budapest, Kingdom of Hungary
- Died: 4 April 2024 (aged 92)
- Awards: European Citizens' Prize; Lifetime Achievement Award, Hungarian Sociological Society; Honorary doctorate, University of Edinburgh
- Scientific career
- Fields: Sociology; Statistics
- Workplaces: Eötvös Loránd University

Zsuzsa Ferge (25 April 1931 – 4 April 2024) was a Hungarian sociologist and statistician who is particularly known for her work on poverty reduction. She was a professor emerita in the Department of Policy, Economics, and Law at Eötvös Loránd University, where she helped to establish a department of social policy studies. She was also the head of the Poverty Research Center there, as well as the Chief Researcher at the Working Unit on Hungary's National Program against Child Poverty, holding both of these positions after her retirement.

== Life and career ==
Ferge was a professor emerita in the Department of Policy, Economics, and Law at Eötvös Loránd University, where she became a full professor in 1988. She was credited with establishing the social policy studies department there. She retired to become a professor emerita in 2001, but after that she continued to head the university's Poverty Research Center.

Methodologically, Ferge's academic work focused on statistical sociology. She focused on poverty in Hungary, and particularly on the collection and analysis of sociological data regarding child poverty. She also engaged in extensive activism to reduce child poverty in Hungary, and she specialised in the interaction of government policy and poverty.

In 1998, Ferge was made a member of the Hungarian Academy of Sciences. In 1993, she was elected to the Academia Europaea.

In 2002, Ferge was awarded the Middle Cross of the Order of Merit of the Republic of Hungary. In 2007 she was the winner of the Hungarian Government's Imre Nagy Order of Merit (hu), and in 2009 she won the Government of Hungary's Twenty Years of the Republic Award (hu). Ferge was a 2010 recipient of the European Citizens' Prize. In 2011, Ferge won the Lifetime Achievement Award from the Hungarian Sociological Society. She also held an honorary doctorate from the University of Edinburgh.

== Death ==
Ferge died on 4 April 2024, at the age of 92.

== Selected awards ==
- Middle Cross, Order of Merit of the Republic of Hungary (2002)
- Imre Nagy Order of Merit (2007)
- Twenty Years of the Republic Award (2009)
- European Citizens' Prize (2010)
- Lifetime Achievement Award, Hungarian Sociological Society (2011)
- Honorary doctorate, University of Edinburgh
