= European Citizen's Prize =

In 2008, the European Parliament introduced the European Citizen's Prize. It is intended to reward on an annual basis, individuals or groups who have particularly distinguished themselves in strengthening European integration by the expression of European cooperation, openness to others and practical involvement in the development of mutual understanding. It is awarded upon nominations of Members of European Parliament.

== Prize ==
The European Citizen's Prize was launched by the European Parliament in 2008 to recognise exceptional achievements by Europeans. In that year, 37 people from 19 member states were selected for the prize in recognition of relevant work done. They received their medals in national award ceremonies and had the chance to showcase their work and meet MEPs at the European Parliament in Brussels on 7–8 November. The awarding of the European Citizen's Prize has continued annually since then, with some projects being linked to the theme of the European year, a specific area of focus which changes every year. The Citizen's Prize may be given for activities that either facilitate cross-border cooperation within the EU or promote better mutual understanding and closer integration between citizens and member states. It may also be awarded for day-to-day activities reflecting the values enshrined in the EU's Charter of Fundamental Rights. The laureates can be citizens, groups, associations or organisations. Every year each MEP has the right to nominate one candidate.

== 2008 winners ==
- José María Muñoa Ganuza
- Associação Nacional de Municípios Portugueses
- Kärntner Konsensgruppe
- Duna Televízió
- Verein zur Förderung des Städtepartnerschaft Leipzig-Travnik
- Lajos Oszlari
- AEDE-Canarias
- Unrepresented Nations and Peoples Organization (UNPO)
- Polska Akcja Humanitarna
- Naturpark Bayerischer Wald e.V.
- Divadlo z Pasáže
- Jochen Gewecke
- Towarzystwo Bambrów Poznańskich
- Bürger Europas
- Federação de Associações de Juventude dos Açores
- Hellenic Fire Service
- Europees Musikfestival voor de Jeugd
- Francisca Sauquillo Pérez del Arco
- Campus 15
- Franz-Josef Meyer
- Grażyna Orłowska-Sondej
- Donaubüro-Ulm
- Kolpingjugend Europa
- Ulla Rüdenholz
- Jean Pierre Daulouede
- Suzana Lipovac and KinderBerg International e.V.
- 2002–2007 administration of the comune of Lula
- Kolegium Europy Wschodniej im. Jana Nowaka-Jeziorańskiego
- Santiago Sánchez-Agustino Rodríguez
- Tomasz Różniak
- Wojciech Wrzesiński
- Raissa Murumets
- Emberi Jogi Központ
- Michael Nielsen
- Luigi Ciotti
- G700 Blog
- Oud Limburgse Schuttersfederatie

== 2010 winners ==
- Schüler Helfen Leben
- Ale Kino! International Young Audience Film Festival
- Ing. Wolfgang Neumann
- Margit Ricarda Rolf* Mobbing-Zentrale* Germany
- European Union of Jewish Students
- Csaba Böjte
- Lothar Czossek
- Fate Velaj
- Elżbieta Lech-Gotthard
- Carlo Petrini
- Free Belarus Initiative
- Fundacja Świętego Mikołaja
- Open Society Foundations
- Stowarzyszenie „Jeden Świat”
- Europ'age Saar-Lor-Lux e.V
- Sermig-Servizio Missionario Giovani
- Europees Grenslanden Vrouwenvoetbal Toernooi
- Stowarzyszenie Lednica 2000
- Chris Delicata
- Enrico Pieri
- Jacques Groffen
- Beneluxliga handbal
- Ινστιτούτο Οδικής Ασφάλειας «Πάνος Μυλωνάς»
- Smaranda Enache
- EYV 2011 Alliance
- Fondazione Banco Alimentare
- Polska Fundacja im. Roberta Schumana
- Zsuzsa Ferge
- Hans Bienfait
- Marek Sołtys

== 2012 winners ==
- Albergo Etico
- Arbeitskreis Schule Rhauderfehn e. V.
- Biagio Conte
- Congresso Ibérico de Jovens Engenheiros
- Colours of Carinthia — Franz Tomazic (Projektleitung für die Personengruppe), Karlheinz Fessl, Christian Brandstätter, Erich Kugi, Lojze Wieser
- DEFRIT
- Deutsch-Französische Gesellschaft Montabaur e.V.
- Dr. Christoph Leitl
- Ελληνική Εταιρεία Περιβάλλοντος και Πολιτισμού
- Ekipa projekta Simbioz@
- Eurofeesten Geel 2012
- Europäische Vereinigung für Eifel und Ardennen
- Giovanni Riefolo
- Gisela Paterkiewicz
- Jacek Łuczak
- Jeunes Européens — France
- Béla Kató
- Latvijas Lauku sieviešu apvienība, padomes priekšsēdētāja, Rasma Freimane
- Lovro Šturm
- Mgr. Victor Grech
- Μουσικό εργαστήρι "Λαβύρινθος"
- PassodopoPasso
- Paul Brusson
- Peter Petrov, Bulgaria
- Petros Souppouris and Huseyin Akansoy
- Polska Federacja Ruchów Obrony Życia
- Gyula Róka
- Sophie Rosseels
- Stichting Werkgroep Polen
- Stolperstein
- Stowarzyszenie św. Celestyna
- Stowarzyszenie Wiosna
- Symon Kliman
- János Székely
- UNITALSI
- Vanhustyön keskusliitto — Centralförbundet för de gamlas väl ry
- Vencer o Tempo, Associação para a Educação e Prevenção da Saúde

== 2013 winners ==
- Alicja Kobus
- Biruta Eglīte
- Boris Pahor
- Children’s International Summer Villages (CISV International)
- Daniel Vogelmann, publisher
- Д-р Милен Врабевски, председател на Фондация Българска Памет
- Dr. Klaus Wilkens
- Elke Jeanrond-Premauer
- Eugenia Bonetti, Presidente 'Slaves No More Onlus', missionaria della Consolata, coordinatrice Ufficio Tratta Donne e Minori dell'USMI
- Euregioschool: leren van de buurtaal door en voor uitwisseling
- Lobby européen des femmes
- Gábor Farkas
- GAA Cumann Lúthchleas Gael
- Hans Zohren
- Heikki Huttunen/Suomen Ekumeeninen Neuvosto
- Hela Sverige ska leva
- Ioana Avadani
- Jacek Glomb
- Junge Europäische Bewegung
- Kuoreveden nuorisoseura Nysäry
- Mag.a (FH) Ursula Kapfenberger-Poindl, DI Hermann Hansy, Karl G Becker, DI Reinhard M. Weitzer, DI Andreas Weiß (allesamt Regionalmanager in Niederösterreich)
- Matthias Zürl
- Mehmet Emin Eminoglu & Άντρια Κυπριανού
- Εθνικό Κέντρο Άμεσης Βοήθειας (EKAB) Κρήτης
- Nistor Elena
- Plataforma Afectados por la Hipoteca
- Professor Richard Demarco
- Puttinu Cares Children`s Cancer Support Group
- Raoul Wallenberg Egyesület
- Real Academia de la Lengua Vasca – Euskaltzaindia
- Associazione "Avvocato di strada" (Street Lawyers) ONLUS
- streetfootballworld
- Teatr Arka
- Ośrodek 'Brama Grodzka* Teatr NN'
- The AIRE Centre
- Urmo Kübar (Executive Director, Network of Estonian Nonprofit Organizations)
- Г-н Валери Нисимов Петров
- Valeriu Nicolae
- Association Vents et marées
- Via Euregio
- Working Together (représentée par M. Laurent Rouillon)
- Youthnet Hellas www.youthnet.gr
- ZZI* Zentrum der zeitgemäßen Initiativen Austria

== 2014 winners ==
- Prof. Anna Wolff-Powęska
- Alojz Rebula
- Andrei Pleşu
- atlatszo.hu
- Dr Bartłomiej Zapała
- BEDNET
- Blue Star Programme
- Bulli Tour Europa
- Cittadini di Lampedusa
- Cocina Economica de Logroño
- Comhaltas Ceoltóirí Éireann
- Demokratisches Ostvorpommern – Verein für politische Kultur e.V.
- Διογένης ΜΚΟ
- Erika Körner-Metz und Gisela Berninger
- Eurodionantes
- Europäische Gesellschaft für Politik, Kultur, Soziales e.V. Diaphania
- EuropeanMigrationLaw
- MUDr. Eva Siracká, DrSc., prezidentka Ligy proti rakovine
- Evropský parlament mládeže v ČR
- Fundacja Pomocy Wzajemnej „Barka”
- Христо Христов
- Jaccede
- Je veux l'Europe
- Kerényi Lajos
- Κέντρο Εκπαιδεύσεως & Αποκαταστάσεως Τυφλών, Περιφερειακή Διεύθυνση Θεσσαλονίκης (πρώην Σχολή Τυφλών Θεσσαλονίκης «Ο ΗΛΙΟΣ»)
- Libera. Associazioni, nomi e numeri contro le mafie
- Malta Hospice Movement
- Maria De Biase
- Marianne Lück
- Martina Čuljak* HelpBalkans
- Mauthausen Komitee Österreich
- Miljötinget
- Младите доброволци от Варна
- Nadace Naše Dítě
- Orden Hospitalaria de San Juan de Dios
- Probstner János
- Sevgül Uludağ και Μιχάλης Χριστοφίδης
- Skills Belgium
- Societat Civil Catalana
- Societatea Timişoara
- SOS SCUOLA di ALVEARE CINEMA
- SOSERM SOS Emergenza Rifugiati Milano
- Spomenka Hribar
- Το χαμόγελο του παιδιού
- Verein.Respekt.net
- Werner Hohlbein, „Wir sitzen alle in einem Boot für mehr Toleranz“
- Wiener Volkshochschulen "Women on the Rise"

== 2015 winners ==
- Antoine Deltour
- Carole Roberts
- Člověk v tísni
- Davide Martello
- Davidovics László
- Die gewollte Donau
- Don Michele De Paolis (EMMAUS)
- Drago Jančar
- Eva Siracká
- Euriade e.V.
- Fundación Barraquer
- Fundacja Integracji Społecznej PROM
- Fundacja Oswoić Los
- Gaia Ferrara
- Gemeinsam leben und lernen in Europa e.V.
- Stichting Heart for Romania
- Hrvatska gorska služba spašavanja
- Ikäihmisten olohuone
- Innovaction
- Instituto Marquês de Valle Flôr
- Istituto di Medicina Solidale Onlus
- Katri Raik
- Κοινωνική Κουζίνα* ο Άλλος Άνθρωπος
- La Ciudad Accesible
- Asociacija „Lietuvos neįgaliųjų forumas“
- Lydia Foy
- Maria Manuela Ramalho Eanes
- Mário João de Oliveira Ruivo
- Medici con l'Africa CUAMM
- Miskolci Speciális Felderítő és Mentőcsoport
- Μητροπολιτικό Κοινωνικό Ιατρείο Ελληνικού
- Netzwerk sozialer Zusammenhalt
- Народно читалище „Бъдеще сега 2006"
- PAMINA Nachwuchsschwimmfest
- PhDr. Marek Hrubec, PhD.
- Rafel Shamri
- Richmond Foundation
- Romska Ungdomsförbundet
- Rūta Dimanta
- Schone Kleren Campagne
- Serge Laborderie
- SLYNCS
- Τάκης Χατζηδημτρίου και Ali Tuncay
- Territoires de la Mémoire
- Tessy Fautsch
- Tina Ellen Lee
- Tomo Križnar
- Yves D. Robert

== 2016 winners ==
- ADRA Česká republika
- Dennis ARVANITAKIS
- Asociacija «Medardo Čoboto Trečiojo amžiaus universitetas»
- Associazione Pegaso
- BALAZS Major
- Aleksandra BANASIAK
- Iordan Gheorghe BĂRBULESCU
- Evgen Angel BAVČAR
- Berufliches Schulzentrum Wurzen; Frau Gabriele Hertel
- Citizens UK
- Citoyennes pour l’Europe
- Coder Dojo
- Conselho Nacional de Juventude
- Csemadokot (Szlovákiai Magyar Társadalmi és Közművelődési Szövetség)
- Dar il-Kaptan
- Sener ELCIL
- ENDSTATION RECHTS.
- Euro-Chess Foundation
- Fondazione Arché Onlus
- Frauen in der Euregio Maas-Rhein
- Fundusz Lokalny Masywu Śnieżnika
- Paul GALLES
- Gautena
- Ομάδα 40 μαθητών από το λύκειο Αποστόλου Λουκά, Κολλοσίου (Group of 40 children from St Luke’s High School, Colossi, Limassol)
- Humanitarna udruga fra Mladen Hrkać
- Internet Watch Foundation (IWF)
- Dr Barbara Helen KNOWLES
- KOZMA Imre
- Menschen im Marchfeld (MiM)
- Mobile School
- Κίνηση Συνύπαρξης και Επικοινωνίας στο Αιγαίο (Movement Coexistence and Communication at Sea)
- Ivan NIKOLOV (Иван Николов)
- ONCE
- Opera per la Gioventù «Giorgio La Pira»
- Mariana PENCHEVA (Мариана Пенчева)
- Perpetuum Mobile ry/Artist at Risk
- Positive Voice
- Dita PŘIKRYLOVÁ
- Proactiva Open Arms
- Pushing
- Alexandre SCHON
- SOS MÉDITERRANÉE
- Nawal Soufi
- Stiftelsen Expo
- Stowarzyszenie Komitet Obrony Demokracji
- Sur les pas d’Albert Londres
- Tiago PITTA E CUNHA
- Vluchtelingenwerk Nederland
- Erwin VOLLERTHUS
- David VSEVIOV

== 2017 winners ==
- Αικατερίνη Παναγοπούλου
- Αμερίκος Αργυρίου
- Антони Стоянов
- Agence de Développement rural Europe et Territoires
- Border Communities against Brexit
- Μπορούμε
- Brexpats* Hear our voice
- Bürger Europas
- Buscant Alternatives
- CERMI (Comité español de representantes de personas con discapacidad)
- Charita Česká Republika
- Cristian Pantazi
- Davide Sousa Moura
- Don Virginio Rigoldi
- Ewa Dados
- Fondazione Opera Immacolata Concezione ONLUS
- Foróige
- Għaqda Każini tal-Banda
- "Glaskunst langs de Maas" van Stichting Ecrevissecomité Obbicht
- Hej Främling!
- Herta Hoffmann
- Hope for girls
- Hrvatska udruga Transplant
- Ján Benčík
- Junge Aktion der Ackermann-Gemeinde
- Labdarības maratona “Dod Pieci” komanda
- Lietuvos moterų lobistinė organizacija
- Mazowieckie Stowarzyszenie Pracy dla Niepełnosprawnych „De Facto”
- Médecins du monde* Belgique
- Mihály Bencze
- Mosaik
- Mouvement du Nid / Délégation du Bas-Rhin
- Pescatori siciliani di Mazara del Vallo
- Plataforma de afectados por Hepatitis C
- Plataforma de Apoio aos Refugiados
- PRAKSIS
- Pulse of Europe
- Robert Hébras
- Saint-Omer Cricket Club Stars
- SámiSoster ry
- Stowarzyszenie Drogami Tischnera
- Strom života
- Students and Refugees Together (START)* Avril Bellinger
- Széll Tamás
- Szilárd István
- Teeme Ära
- Teresa de Sousa
- Tvrtko Barun
- #VORREIPRENDEREILTRENO ONLUS
- ZDUS* Zveza društev upokojencev Slovenije

== 2018 winners ==
- Alicja Szatkowska
- Αντρέας Μάτσης/Okan Dugli (Bi-communal Famagusta Initiative)
- Άνεμος ανανέωσης
- António Pinto Monteiro
- Antonio Silvio Caló
- Архимандрит Партений Фидановски
- Bjorn Formosa
- Čebelarska zveza Slovenije
- Centre Mondial de la Paix
- Dmitri Rõbakov
- Don Virginio Colmegna
- Ehrenamtlicher Dolmetscherdienst der Stadt Ludwigsburg
- Eurooppanuoret ry
- Fatta!
- Fo.B.A.P. ONLUS
- Förderverein der Sozialklinik Kalamata
- Fundação Francisco Manuel dos Santos
- Fundació Arrels
- HOPEgenesis
- Hrvatski ured za kreativnost i inovacije
- HUMAIN Vzw/asbl
- Iespējamā misija
- Inner City Helping Homeless
- Institut für Erinnerungskultur 2.0 NeverForgetWhy
- Irish Men's Sheds Association
- J.C.A. Akerboom
- Κιβωτός του κόσμου
- La Maison des Femmes de Saint-Denis
- Laurent Festas
- MagiCAMP
- Matthäus Weiß, 1. Landesvorsitzender und der Verband Deutscher Sinti und Roma e.V. Landesverband Schleswig-Holstein
- Mihai Sora
- Nagycsaládosok Országos Egyesülete (NOE)
- Odile Linden
- Paola Scagnelli
- Pierre Maurice
- Plateforme citoyenne de soutien aux réfugiés
- Polish Jews Forum
- Post Bellum
- Pražský studentský summit
- Proyecto Integra de la Fundación Universidad Camilo José Cela
- Refugees Welcome Crawley
- Σενέρ Λεβέντ
- Spirit of Football e.V.
- Stichting De Aldenborgh
- Švento Jokūbo Kelio Savivaldybių Asociacija
- Szvorák Katalin
- Unidad de Gestión Clínica de Medicina Maternofetal, Genética y Reproducción (UGCMFG) del Hospital Universitario Virgen del Rocío
- Varga Erika
- Wielka Orkiestra Świątecznej Pomocy

== 2020 winners ==
- Paraplü
- Euro Babble
- Generation Climate Europe
- Medea/ Snezhina Petrova, Legal Art Centre
- See Through Music/ Melina Krumoa, Foundation "Music for Bulgaria"
- BORANKA (PAINT IT BACK)
- Social Mediation in Practice (ICLAIM)
- Culture meets volunteerisim (Kostas Vichas)
- CIIRC CTU Czech Institute of Informatics, Robotics, and Cybernetics, Czech Technical University in Prague
- Read aloud
- EKOenergy ecolabel
- Association Banlieue Santé* Opération #Enmodedeconfiné
- 91st International Session of the European Youth Parliament
- Symbiosis
- Oltalom karitativ egyesület / Gabor IVANYI
- Keresztény társadalmi elvek a gazdaságban posztgraduális képzés / Laura Sarolta BARITZ (Post-graduate course in Christian Social Principles in the Economy
- Irish Girl Guides Europe Badge
- Family Careers Ireland
- Le Voci della Memoria (Voices of Remembrance)
- Organizācijas "ManaBalss"* digitālās platformas pilsoniskajāi līdzdalībai
- Pizza4doctors
- #AllDagEngBA / #BitzDoheem
- Lockdown Festival
- Stichting Geen Grens (No borders)
- Inicjatywa Wolne Sady (Free Courts Initiative)
- Education for active citizenship, youth empowerment and skills development
- Developing the Romanian National Child Cancer Registry
- Olympiáda ľudských práv (Human Rights Olympiad)
- Neighbourhood Solidarity Networks Somos Tribu VK (Puente de Vallecas)* We are tribe VK
- Yalla Trappan

== 2021 winners ==
- eljub European Youth Encounters
- Paars (Purple)
- TheMayor.EU* The European Portal for Cities and Citizens
- With One Dream United
- Documentary films: ‘Our Wall’ and ‘My Homeland’
- Masaryk University Volunteer Centre MUNI HELPS
- European Debate Initiative
- Youth English Club
- The volunteers (about 800) of the Crises Helpline
- Franco-German citizens’ dialogue on strengthening cross-border cooperation
- International Youth Theatre Festival ‘Wilde Mischung’ (‘Mad Mix’) in Schwäbisch Hall
- ELEPAP Rehabilitation for those with disabilities
- Emergency Exit operation – international educational cooperation
- Too Into You campaign by Women's Aid
- FROLLA Microbiscottificio micro biscuit factory
- Activity to support residents of Belarus
- Liene Dambina
- Mano Guru
- RespectEachOther
- Monument of Mercy
- Project Phoenix of Stichting AeroDelft
- Defending the dignity and independence of judges fighting for judicial independence in Poland
- UMP* Uniao das Misericórdias
- Geofolk
- Zmudri Civics stream
- Kristina Modic and Dr Samo Zver – For solidarity and pan-European health progress for cancer patients
- Villa de Moya volunteers for the reception and integration of illegal migrants
- The Navet (‘Hub’) Association in Bergsjön and its Collaborative Creation Project

== 2022 winners ==
- Civil courage – Initiative against the deportation of schoolgirls
- My talents. for diversity
- The Coordination Centre of Promote Ukraine (Marta Barandiy)
- FUND 5.5
- OXYGONO (Cyprus Forum & Nomoplatform)
- Charita Znojmo’s humanitarian assistance to Ukraine
- #HolkyzMarketingu
- Europe Dialogue
- Assisting Ukraine and ‘Ukraina heaks!’ (For Ukraine) initiative
- InteRadional
- ApplicAid
- Doctors of the World* Greece: Emergency response to humanitarian crisis
- Miklós Both, folk song collector
- Jigsaw Pandemic Response
- Connect Migrant Youth
- #siamotuttelaura
- Young people remember the Shoah – SOS UKRAINE
- Hospiss LV
- BLUE/YELLOW
- Slava Ukrayini Luxembourg
- The Daphne Caruana Galizia Foundation
- News checkers (‘Nieuwscheckers’)
- José Andrés, the chef that feeds the refugees of the war in Ukraine
- Volunteers Without Borders’ – refugees from Ukraine
- Tampinhas’ bottle cap project
- Support for refugee children from Ukraine
- Europe in a Cube (Kniha Európa v Kocke)
- Legal Network for the Protection of Democracy
- Customer Service in Bank Branches· ‘#SOY MAYOR, NO IDIOTA’
- ANAR 116000 Helpline for missing children

== See also ==
- List of awards for contributions to society
