= Border Communities Against Brexit =

Border Communities Against Brexit (BCAB) is an organisation which seeks to protect people who live close to the border between the Republic of Ireland and Northern Ireland from the claimed negative consequences of Brexit. The organisation is active in both Northern Ireland and the Republic of Ireland. In July 2017, the European Parliament awarded the group a European Citizen's Prize.

== Protests ==
On 8 October 2016, six protests took place along the border. One took place at Carrickcarnon, Dundalk, where a mock customs checkpoint was set up. About 150 protesters gathered at the border between Belcoo in County Fermanagh and Blacklion in County Cavan. There were also protests at Moybridge between Tyrone and Monaghan, Aghalane between Fermanagh and Cavan and Lifford Bridge between Tyrone and Donegal.

In late March 2017, the organisation marched on Stormont. The protest included about 300 people, including SDLP leader Colum Eastwood and Sinn Féin leader in the North, Michelle O'Neill. In September 2019, leaders of the organisation met with the French ambassador to Ireland, Stephane Crouzat. In January 2020, the organisation organised a protest alongside the Irish border.

== See also ==
- Euroscepticism in Ireland
- Irish border question
