= Iordan Bărbulescu =

Romanian university professor and diplomat

Iordan Gheorghe Barbulescu
- Born: January 20, 1952 (age 74); Stoileşti, Vâlcea County, Romania
- Awards: National Order of Faithful Service; European Citizens' Prize

Academic background
- Education: University of the Basque Country
- Thesis: La preadhesión de los Países de Europa Central a la Unión Europea, elemento clave para la reunificación europea con especial referencia al caso de Rumania, (1990-1996) (1996)
- Doctoral advisor: Francisco Aldecoa

Academic work
- Discipline: European studies
- Institutions: Școala Națională de Studii Politice și Administrative
- Notable students: Victor Negrescu

Iordan Gheorghe Bărbulescu (born 20 January 1952) is a Romanian university professor and diplomat. He is currently dean of the department of international relations and European studies of the National University of Political Studies and Public Administration in Bucharest, as well as president of the senate of this university. He is also president of the Romanian Association for International Relations and European Studies (ARRISE). He has a doctorate from the University of the Basque Country, with a thesis on the pre-accession of eastern European countries to the European Union. He was also a diplomat in Romania's ministry of foreign affairs (1997-2003), and a member of the joint committee on preparation for the negotiations of Romania's accession to the European Union.

== Awards and distinctions ==
In 2002 professor Barbulescu was admitted to the National Order of Faithful Service with the rank of Knight for his contribution to the promotion of Romania's foreign policy. In 2016 he also received the European Citizen's Prize awarded by the European Parliament.
