= Ahmed bin Mohammed Al Jarwan =

Emirati diplomat

H.E. Ahmed bin Mohamed Al Jarwan
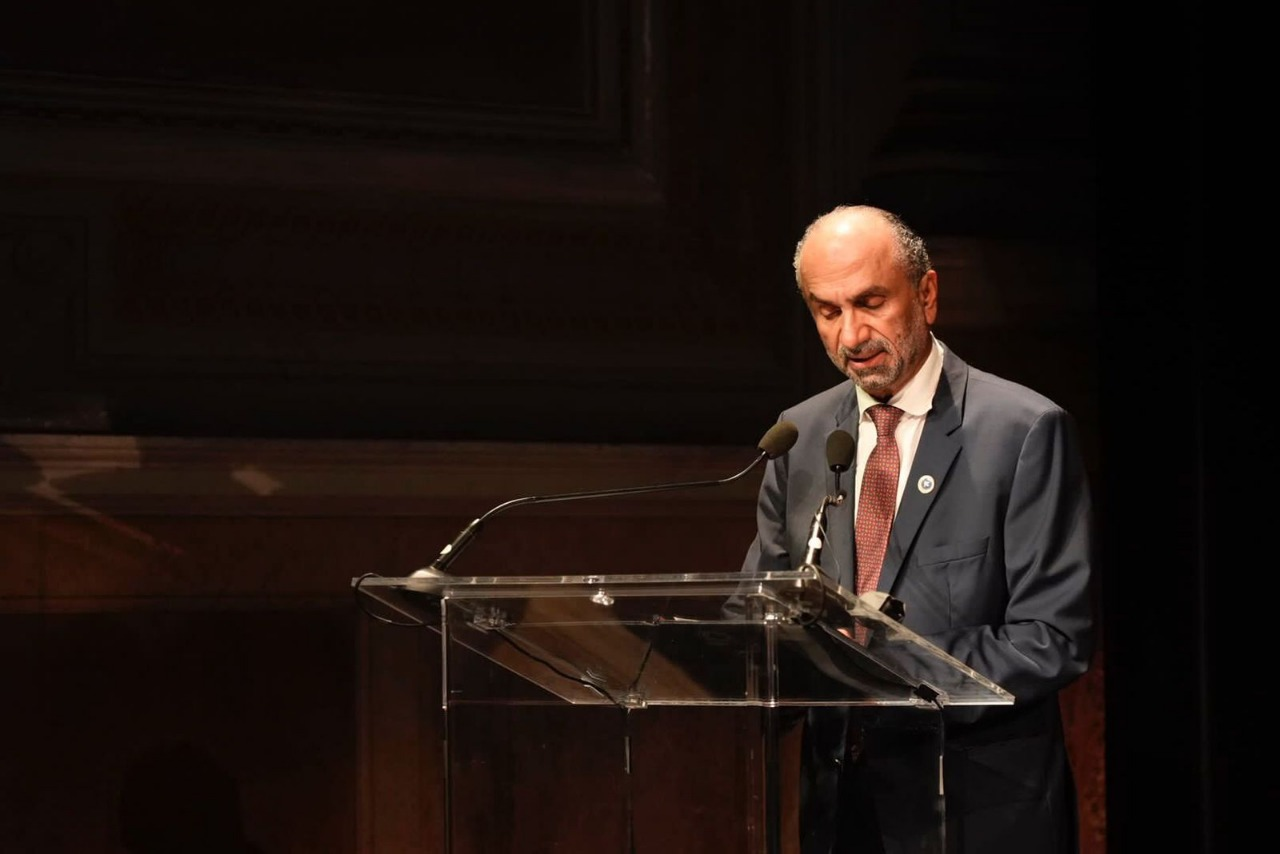
- Born: August 25, 1962 (age 64); Sharjah, UAE
- Education: Institut Universitaire de Technologie de Ville d’Avray, France Technical Military College, Egypt Pierre and Marie Curie University Paris, France Naval Postgraduate School, Monterey, California Georgetown University, USA Fletcher School of Law and Diplomacy, Tufts University, USA Zayed University, UAE
- Known for: President - Global Council for Tolerance and Peace President - General Union of Arab Experts President - Paris Forum for Peace and Development Chairman - Executive Office of Arab Federations’ Forum, Arab League
- Website: https://gctpnews.org/

Ahmed bin Mohammed Al Jarwan (born August 25, 1962) is an Emirati diplomat and President of the Global Council for Tolerance and Peace.

== Education ==
Ahmed Al Jarwan completed his master’s degree in Aeronautical Engineering from Institut Universitaire de Technologie de Ville d’Avray, France. He completed an International Defense Management course at Naval Postgraduate School in Monterey, California. He also enrolled in Georgetown University, the USA, to complete a diploma in leadership courses. He has also attended Fletcher School of Law and Diplomacy at Tufts University and Zayed University.

== Career ==
Ahmed Al Jarwan started his career at the UAE Armed Forces where he took a number of positions. The UAE Government then sent him to France to study aeronautical engineering. Later he was sent to Egypt and the US for the preparation of becoming a UAE ambassador. During Federal National Council (FNC) elections, he was doing a side job as the head of one of Sharjah’s car museum. He was a member of Federal National Council (FNC) from 2011 to 2019. When Ahmed Al Jarwan was elected to the FNC, he was elected by the Arab Parliament to be its speaker.

In 2017, Ahmed Al Jarwan co-founded the Global Council for Tolerance and Peace, along with eight other members including Sam Zakhem, Fatlinda Tahiri, Hersh Chadha, Mufeed Chehab, Hugo Barabucci, Bourhane Hamidou, Yenny Zannuba, and Joseph Ellul. In 2018, Ahmed Al Jarwan was elected president of the General Union of Arab Experts.

In 2021, Ahmed Al Jarwan was elected as President of Paris Peace Forum by the general assembly. In the same year, he also served as Head of the Executive Office of the Forum and President of the General Union of Arab Experts.

== Honors and achievements ==
Ahmed Al Jarwan was presented the Key of Panama by H. E. José Luis Fábrega, Mayor of Panama City.
