= Marta Barandii =

Belgo-Ukrainian politician, activist and lawyer

- Марта Барандій
- Born: June 13, 1984 (age 41); Lviv, Ukrainian SSR, Soviet Union

Marta Volodymyrivna Barandii (Note: Officially Barandiy) (Ukrainian: Марта Володимирівна Барандій, born June 13, 1984) is a Ukrainian-born Belgian politician, lead candidate for European elections with the Flemish party Voor U, previously an activist, lawyer, and founder of the Promote Ukraine organization.

She is an organizer of numerous events dedicated to the geopolitical situation in Ukraine after the Revolution of Dignity (Euromaidan). For more than 4 years, she has been the editor-in-chief of the Brussels Ukraina Review magazine, whose 8th issue in December 2021 covered the possible Russian attack on Ukraine at that time. Coordinator of the team of volunteers who help Ukraine and Ukrainians in Belgium with the Ukrainian Hub at Station Europe, which was inaugurated by the President of the European Parliament and the European Economic and Social Committee (EESC), and was awarded the European Citizen's Prize (2022). Works to promote Ukrainian interests, support civil society and protect human rights and freedoms. Head of the Brussels office of the Ukrainian law firm Asters (2018–2021). She is a guest lecturer at the Ukrainian Free University in Munich and Director of International Relations at the Ukrainian magazine Business Woman in Brussels.

== Early life and education ==
Marta Barandii was born on June 13, 1984, in Lviv, Ukraine.

She pursued her education in the field of law (Dr. iur.) and international relations. Barandiy completed a master's degree in International Law and International Relations from Ivan Franko University in Lviv (Ukraine) in 2005. She obtained an LL.M. Eur. (Master after Master in European Law) from the Europainstitut at the Saarland University (Germany), from 2007 to 2008.

She completed her Ph.D. in International Law from the Saarland University (Germany), between June 2009 and July 2012. Barandiy's doctoral publication, written in German, is titled in English as Sovereignty as a Remedy for the Securing of the Interests of States.

== Career ==
Barandiy started her professional career as a consultant during an internship at the European Parliament in Brussels in July 2004. In 2007, she continued her internship as a Research support in Mission of Ukraine to the European Union in Brussels, where she prepared speeches of diplomats and researched on EU-Ukraine relations.

Barandiy joined Volvo Group in Ghent (Belgium) in October 2012.

=== Promote Ukraine ===
In May 2014 in Brussels, during the Ukrainian Revolution of Dignity, Barandiy founded the Promote Ukraine VZM an NGO that is committed to supporting civil society, promoting human rights and freedom, and fostering political and economic development, and advocating for the Ukrainian cause to the EU policymakers.

She was the editor-in-chief of the quarterly magazine Brussels Ukraine Review, a European publication about Ukraine. The magazine is published in Ukrainian, English and several other European languages.

Since the beginning of the Russian invasion of Ukraine in 2022, Promote Ukraine has been able to consolidate about a hundred activists. The lack of a permanent location was solved by a letter to the President of the European Parliament Roberta Metsola, which outlined the need for such a space. The initiative was supported, and on March 17, 2022, the keys to the building in the European quarter of Brussels (Ukrainian Civil Society Hub) were symbolically handed over. Since March 2022, it has been supported by the European Parliament and the European Economic and Social Committee, whose Presidents Roberta Mecola and Krista Schweng have supported the organization's efforts to help Ukraine and Ukrainians and to prepare Ukraine's future in the EU. Thanks to this support, the volunteer coordination center Promote Ukraine was transformed into the Promote Ukraine Hub.

In particular, Promote Ukraine's work was recognized in 2022, when the organization received the honorary European Citizen's Prize, which is awarded by the European Parliament.

=== Legal practice ===
As a freelance counsel at the Ukrainian law firm Asters, she headed the company's Brussels office, which started operating in November 2018. She worked there until 2021.

== Bibliography ==
- Marta Barandiy. Europäische Integration der Ukraine und Souveränität (AV Akademikerverlag, 2012) ISBN 978-3-639-39177-0
- Marta Barandiy. Souveränität als Gewährleistung der Interessen der Staaten: Völkerrechtliche und europarechtliche Aspekte (Peter-Lang-Verlagsgruppe, 2012) ISBN 978-3-631-62862-1
