= Dita Přikrylová =

Czech NGO Czechitas founder

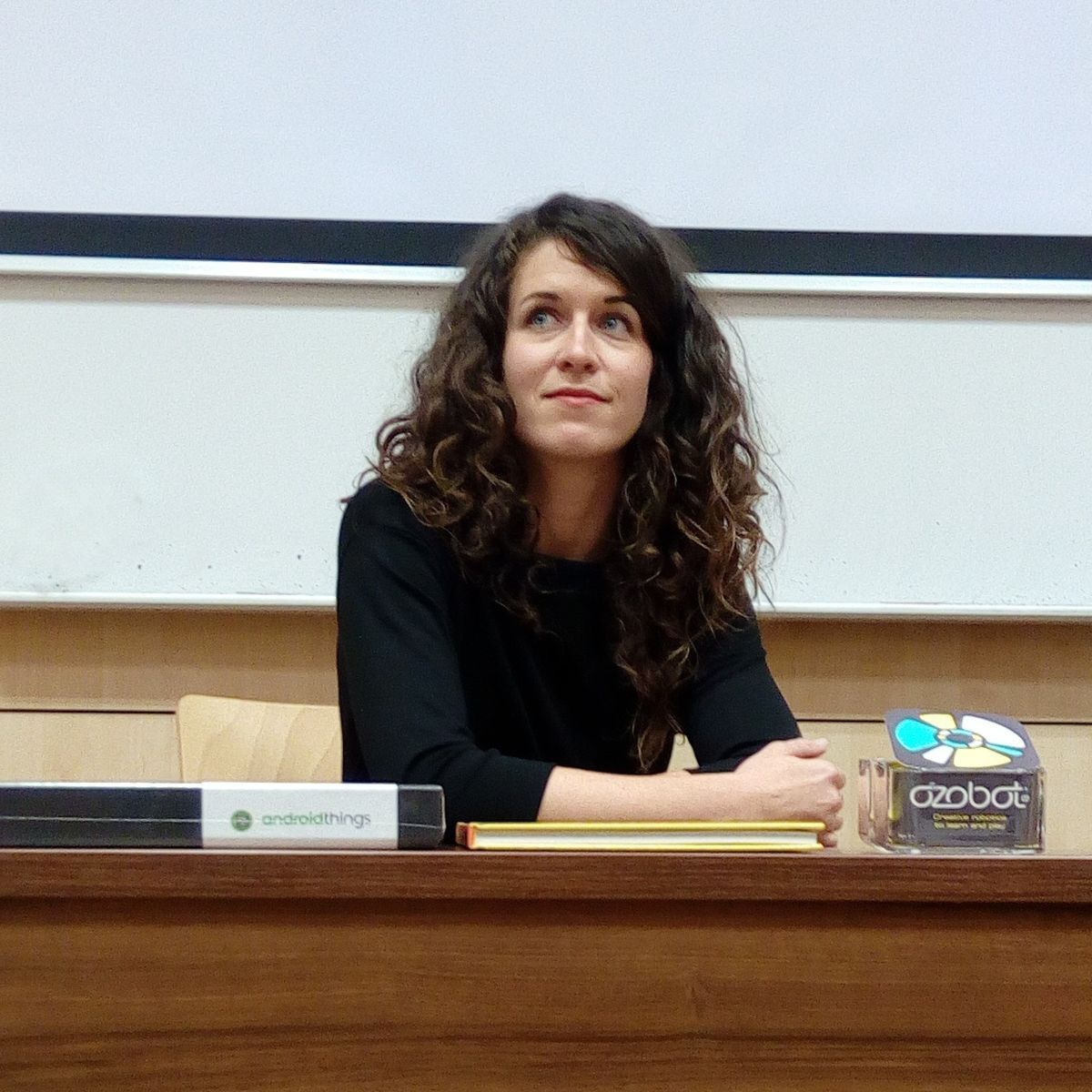
Dita Přikrylová in 2017

Dita Přikrylová (born 26 February 1989) is a Czech software engineer, a social entrepreneur, and the founder of Czechitas, a non-profit organization based upon Girls Who Code which provides technical education and networking possibilities for women and youth in information technologies.

She is a David Rockefeller fellow of The Trilateral Commission.

== Education ==
Přikrylová studied Systems Engineering at the Faculty of Economics and Administration and Applied Computer Science at the Faculty of Informatics, both at Masaryk university in Brno.

Přikrylová was selected as the only Czech participant in both the worldwide 2016 Young Transatlantic Innovation Leaders Initiative (YTILI) held by the United States Department of State and the Global Entrepreneurship Summit (GES) in Palo Alto, California.

== Career ==
Přikrylová is most known for her work with Czechitas focusing on retraining women between the ages 20 and 45 in coding and information technologies. She founded Czechitas in 2014 with the goal of dismantling stereotypes and encouraging women and girls to learn coding to move into IT careers. The non-profit offers classes all over the Czech Republic and maintains community education centers in Brno and Prague.

Via a partnership between Czechitas and Microsoft Corporation, Přikrylová helped create an Academy of Programming for children in the Czech Republic where youth aged 8 to 26 could obtain free online training, tutorials and resources for various computer programs.

In 2016, with Christian Hirsig and Cornelia Meyer, she cofounded Powercoders, a non-profit in Switzerland with centers in Lausanne and Zurich that teach refugees coding skills to improve their possibilities for employment.

Apart from Czechitas, she is a business developer at the Prague branch of GreenFox Academy, a coding bootcamp began in Hungary, which offers free computer programming courses for women.

Přikrylová serves on the Advisory Board of Social Impact Awards, a non-profit incubator for social entrepreneurship and innovation, where she represents over 500 program alumni ventures. She is also a board member of Cesko.digital, a non-profit online community for IT professionals in the Czech Republic who do pro-bono IT work for non-profits, government entities and NGO's.

As of September 2020, Přikrylová is the Director of Diversity, Inclusion and Communities for the Czech anti-virus software company Avast.

== Awards and honours ==
In 2016, Přikrylová was awarded the European Citizen's Prize by the European Parliament for her efforts to increase women's and girls' technical and digital literacy. The same year, she was selected as one of 30 youngest business leaders in the Czech Republic under the age of 30 by Forbes magazine

In 2017, she received the South by Southwest Community Service Award from SXSW in Austin, Texas.

Also in 2017, Přikrylová was a member of the Aspen Institute Young Leaders Program in Central Europe.

In 2018, she was selected as the Female Role Model of the year by Central European Startups Award,

== Publications and presentations ==
- Přikrylová, Dita (2016). Business intelligence models for capturing and analysis of enterprise marketing data (Masters Thesis). Masarykova univerzita, Fakulta informatiky.
- Přikrylová, Dita (2017). Czechitas, or Why There Is a Lack of IT in Women Rather Than of Women in IT. April, 2017, Aspen Review.
- Buhnova, Barbora and Přikrylová, Dita (2019). Women Want to Learn Tech: Lessons from the Czechitas Education Project. May 27, 2019, 2019 IEEE/ACM 2nd International Workshop on Gender Equality in Software Engineering (GE).
- Přikrylová, Dita (2019). How to kick off your tech career - Dita Přikrylová (Czechitas). June 19, 2019, Code.Kiwi.Org.
- Buhnova, Barbora, Jurystova, Lucie and Přikrylová, Dita (2019). Assisting women in career change towards software engineering: experience from Czechitas NGO. September, 2019, ECSA '19: Proceedings of the 13th European Conference on Software Architecture.
