= Nawal Soufi =

Nawal Soufi (Arabic: نوال الصوفي; born 1988 in Morocco) is a Moroccan-Italian social worker and human rights activist. She also has been active in immigration and is a sympathizer of the Palestinian cause.

== Biography ==
Soufi was born in Morocco of Moroccan parents but just after a few weeks after the birth the family moved to Catania at the foot of Etna in Italy. She was only fourteen when she began her social career, helping Moroccan immigrants and Italian homeless to survive in their daily lives. She continued her social work activities when she grew up. She earned a degree in political science and international relations, while working part-time as an interpreter in Sicilian courts and prisons.

She was affected by the Palestinian struggle and the Arab Spring. In December 2012 she traveled to Syria and headed a humanitarian convoy which helped about 800 families there. She offered her help for Syrians who were trying to take refuge in Italy.

== Activities ==
Soufi became known in 2013 when she saved a boat lost in the Mediterranean Sea, with hundreds of Syrian refugees aboard in danger of drowning. She received a call demanding rescue from one of the immigrants.

Honored by this achievement she made aid for migrants her daily struggle. In this way she has contributed to the saving of more than 2 million migrants struggling at sea, to date.

== Awards ==
Soufi has won several awards for the documentaries she made in Syria and Libya in 2014. These include the "Pioneer Woman - Donna di Frontiera" and "Border Woman" Award from the jurors of the Marzamemi International Frontier Film Festival.

Soufi was awarded the European Citizens' Prize in 2016. She won the prize of initiative artisans of hope in 2017 chaired by Emir Mohammed bin Rashid Al Maktoum in Dubai a distinction aimed at promoting Arab skills working for positive change through projects and initiatives.

Soufi is the subject of the book Nawal: Angel of the Refugees, released in 2016 in Italy.
