= The Free Belarus Initiative =

Polish Organization

The Free Belarus Initiative (Polish: Inicjatywa Wolna Białoruś) is a Polish NGO that supports freedom of movement in Belarus. It was registered as a Non-Governmental Organization on 24 July 2006 in Poland (KRS 0000260915).

The activities of the Initiative are threefold:

- direct support for the pro-democratic movements in Belarus
- motivating Poles as well as other nationals to support the Belarusians in their struggle for democracy and human Rights.
- delivering up-to-date information about political repression in Belarus, supporting campaigns for the democratic opposition, a free press, and the free flow of information from the country.

The Initiative, in cooperation with the public Polish Television (TVP) and the authorities of the city of Warsaw, organizes annual "Solidarity with Belarus" concerts.

The office of the President of the Board is occupied by Jacek Kastelaniec.
