= Mário Ruivo =

Portuguese biologist (1927-2017)

- Born: 3 March 1927; Campo Maior, Portugal
- Died: 25 January 2017 (aged 89); Lisbon, Portugal
- Education: University of Lisbon
- Occupations: Biologist, politician
- Honours: Legião de Honra, Grã-Cruz da Ordem do Mérito, Grande-Oficial da Ordem do Infante Dom Henrique, Grande-Oficial da Ordem Militar de Sant'Iago da Espada

Mário João de Oliveira Ruivo (3 March 1927 – 25 January 2017) was a Portuguese scientist and politician, a pioneer in the defense of the ocean and the environment in Portugal. He briefly held ministerial offices in the Portuguese government after the Carnation Revolution, but spent most of his career in senior positions in numerous governmental and non-governmental environmental agencies and scientific organisations.

== Early life and education ==
In the 1940s, he was a prominent leader of the Direção Universitária de Lisboa and of MUD Juvenil (a youth organization), being arrested for his political activities against the dictatorship in 1947.

After a degree in Biology, from the Faculty of Sciences of the University of Lisbon (1950), he got a degree in biological oceanography and living resources management from the University Paris-Sorbonne (1951-1954), and conducted extensive research in Portugal and other European countries.

== Political career ==
Having returned to Portugal, he was part of the editorial board of Seara Nova, an anti-dictatorship magazine.

After the Carnation Revolution, he was Minister of Foreign Affairs, in the V Provisional Government (1975) and Secretary of State for Fisheries in the II, III and IV Provisional Governments (1974-1975).

== Scientific career ==
From 1961 to 1974, he was the director of the Division of Environment and Aquatic Resources, of the Department of Fisheries, of the Food and Agriculture Organization, in Rome. Between 1975 and 1979, he was Director-General of Environment and Aquatic Resources, at the Ministry for Agriculture and Fisheries and Head of the Portuguese Delegation to the United Nations Conference on the Law of the Sea (1974-1978). He was Executive Secretary of the Intergovernmental Oceanographic Commission of UNESCO (1980-1988), member of the Consultative Council of the Junta Nacional de Investigação Científica e Tecnológica (1986-1995) and president of the Independent Evaluation and Control Commission – COMBO Project, MEPAT (1996-1997). He was also the Coordinator of the Independent World Commission on the Oceans (1995-1998), member of the Strategic Commission for the Oceans (2003-2004), and scientific adviser of EXPO98, dedicated to the subject “The Oceans – a Heritage for the Future”.

He was a member of the Board of Trustees of the International Ocean Institute and vice-president of the European Association of Marine Science and Technology.

Mário Ruivo was one of the founders and president of Eurocean – European Centre for information on Marine Science and Technology, in 2002, an independent organisation with the aim to facilitate information exchange in the field of marine sciences and technologies, located in Lisbon.

He was in the Board of Directors of the National Centre for Culture (Centro Nacional de Cultura), a member of the Lisbon Geographic Society, and a permanent member of the General Council of the Mário Soares Foundation, among other relevant positions.

Until his passing, in 2017, he was the president of the Intersectorial Oceanographic Commission, of the Ministry of Science, Technology and Higher Education, president of the National Council of the Environment and Sustainable Development, and president of the Permanent Forum for Ocean Affairs.

== Legacy ==
He died in Lisbon, on 25 January 2017, aged 89 years.

In 2012, Eurocean created the Mário Ruivo Prize, with the goal of raising public awareness to the importance of the ocean and its services to humankind.

In 2018, the Ministry of the Sea launched the Prize Mário Ruivo – Ocean Generations, to promote the knowledge about the ocean among the youth, especially on its relevance for everyday life and for the future of humankind.

== Awards and honors ==
- Portugal Grand Officer of the Order of Prince Henry (21 August 1990)
- Malta Companion of the National Order of Merit (3 March 1995)
- Portugal Grand Officer of the Military Order of Saint James of the Sword, awarded for exceptional and outstanding merits in literature, science and arts (9 June 1998)
- Brazil Grand Cross of the National Order of Scientific Merit (October 1998)
- Portugal Grand Cross of the Order of Merit (9 July 1999)
- France Chevalier of the Légion d’Honneur

== Distinctions ==
- Gold Medal of the Foundation for International Studies (1996)
- Açor de Cristal awarded by Mostra Atlântica de Televisão (1997)
- "Prestígio" Prize (1997)
- Bordalo de Honra Prize, Casa da Imprensa (2000)
- Career Award – Environment National Prize (2007);
- Doutor Honoris Causa, University of Azores (January 2010).
- Mérito Municipal Grau Ouro Medal, Campo Maior Municipality (2010)
- Terras sem Sombra International Award - Biodiversity (2011)
- European Citizen's Prize, awarded by the European Parliament (2015), for his contribution to “European cooperation and the promotion of common European values”.
- Doutor Honoris Causa, University of Algarve (December 2016).

== Works ==
- Sobre as populações e migrações da sardinha - "clupea pilchardus walb" - da costa portuguesa (1950);
- Contribuição para o estudo das relações entre os comprimentos do bacalhau (gadus callarias L.) inteiro, escalado e verde, pescado na Terra-Nova (1957);
- Dom Carlos de Bragança, naturalista e oceanógrafo (1958);
- Aparelhos e métodos de pesca à linha usados na frota bacalhoeira portuguesa (com António Nunes de Oliveira) (2011);
- Do mar oceano ao mar português (2015).
