= Georges Berthoin =

French politician (1925–2024)

- Born: 17 May 1925; Nérac, France
- Died: 27 July 2024 (aged 99); Grand-Brassac, Dordogne, France
- Education: University of Grenoble
- Occupations: Diplomat; Civil servant
- Father: Jean Berthoin

Georges Berthoin (17 May 1925 – 27 July 2024) was a French politician and diplomat who served as chief of staff to Jean Monnet from 1952 to 1955. He was made an officer of the Legion of Honour in 2006, and a commander of the National Order of Merit in 2013. Born in Nérac, Lot-et-Garonne on 17 May 1925, he died on 27 July 2024, at the age of 99.
