= Thierry Déau =

French business executive

- Born: Fort-de-France, Martinique
- Education: Ecole Nationale des Ponts et Chaussées
- Occupations: Chairman and Chief Executive Officer of Meridiam

Thierry Déau is the founder, chairman and chief executive officer of Meridiam, a leading independent global investor and asset manager specialized in developing, financing and managing long-term public infrastructure projects.

== Career ==
After graduating from France’s engineering school l'Ecole nationale des Ponts et Chaussées, Déau began his career in Malaysia with the construction firm GTM International. He then joined France’s Caisse des Dépôts et Consignations, where he held several positions within its investment and development subsidiary Egis Projects, from Project Manager in Manila, Philippines, then Director of Concession Projects in Paris to his appointment as Chief Executive Officer of Egis in 2001.

During his tenure at Egis he headed up international operations for the Egis Group executive committee, served on its risk management committee and acted as Member and Chairman on the boards of several subsidiaries.

In 2004, before founding Meridiam, Déau joined AECOM Technology as Director.

In 2005, Déau established Meridiam, with operational and financial support from AECOM Technology and the Crédit Agricole Group. He is currently Meridiam’s Chairman and Chief Executive Officer, as well as its main shareholder.

== Other activities ==
Thierry Déau's other activities:

- Board Member of Fondation des Ponts, Board Member of the Friends of the Paris Opera (AROP)
- Chairman of the Établissement public du Palais de la Porte Dorée
- Founder of the Africa Infrastructure fellowship program (AIFP)
- Founding Member of the Sustainable Development Investment Partnership (SDIP) of the World Economic Forum
- Chairman of the Fast-Infra Group (FIG)
- President of the Archery Foundation
- Member of The Trilateral Commission.
