= Barbora Bühnová =

Czech IT specialist and tech advocate (1981–2024)

- Born: Barbora Zimmerová; 18 February 1981
- Died: 5 December 2024 (aged 43)
- Education: University of Prague
- Known for: Founder of "Czechitas"
- Engineering career
- Discipline: Computer science
- Practice name: Czechitas
- Employer(s): Masaryk University
- Projects: Research concentrated on how to create systems to eliminate threats in artificial intelligence
- Significant advance: Modelling and Formal Analysis of Component-Based Systems in View of Component Interaction
- Awards: Masaryk University Rector’s Award for Volunteering (2024)

Barbora Bühnová (née Zimmerová; 18 February 1981 – 5 December 2024) was a Czech computer scientist and expert in the field of software engineering and information technology. She was vice-dean of the Faculty of Informatics of Masaryk University in Brno, and co-founder of Czechitas, an organization promoting opportunities for women and girls in information technology. She regularly topped lists of the most influential women in tech in the Czech Republic, and was involved in promoting computer science among women and girls and advancing equal opportunities for women in technology.

== Biography ==
Barbora Bühnová first started studying computer science after high school, when she was encouraged by a math teacher to apply for courses in computer science at university.

Bühnová would go on to dedicate her professional life to computer science. She studied economics at the Faculty of Economics and Business at the University of Prague and computer science at the Faculty of Information Technology of the University of Prague. In 2008, she earned her doctorate in computer science, specializing in "Modelling and Formal Analysis of Component-Based Systems in View of Component Interaction".

After earning her PhD, she joined the Faculty of Information Technology at Masaryk University in Brno. At Masaryk University, Bühnová worked as an associate professor and vice-dean for external relations. She completed her habilitation in computer science at Masaryk in 2017. At Masaryk University, she led the Software Architectures research group within the Lab of Software Architectures and Information Systems. A core focus of her research concentrated on how to create systems to eliminate threats in artificial intelligence.

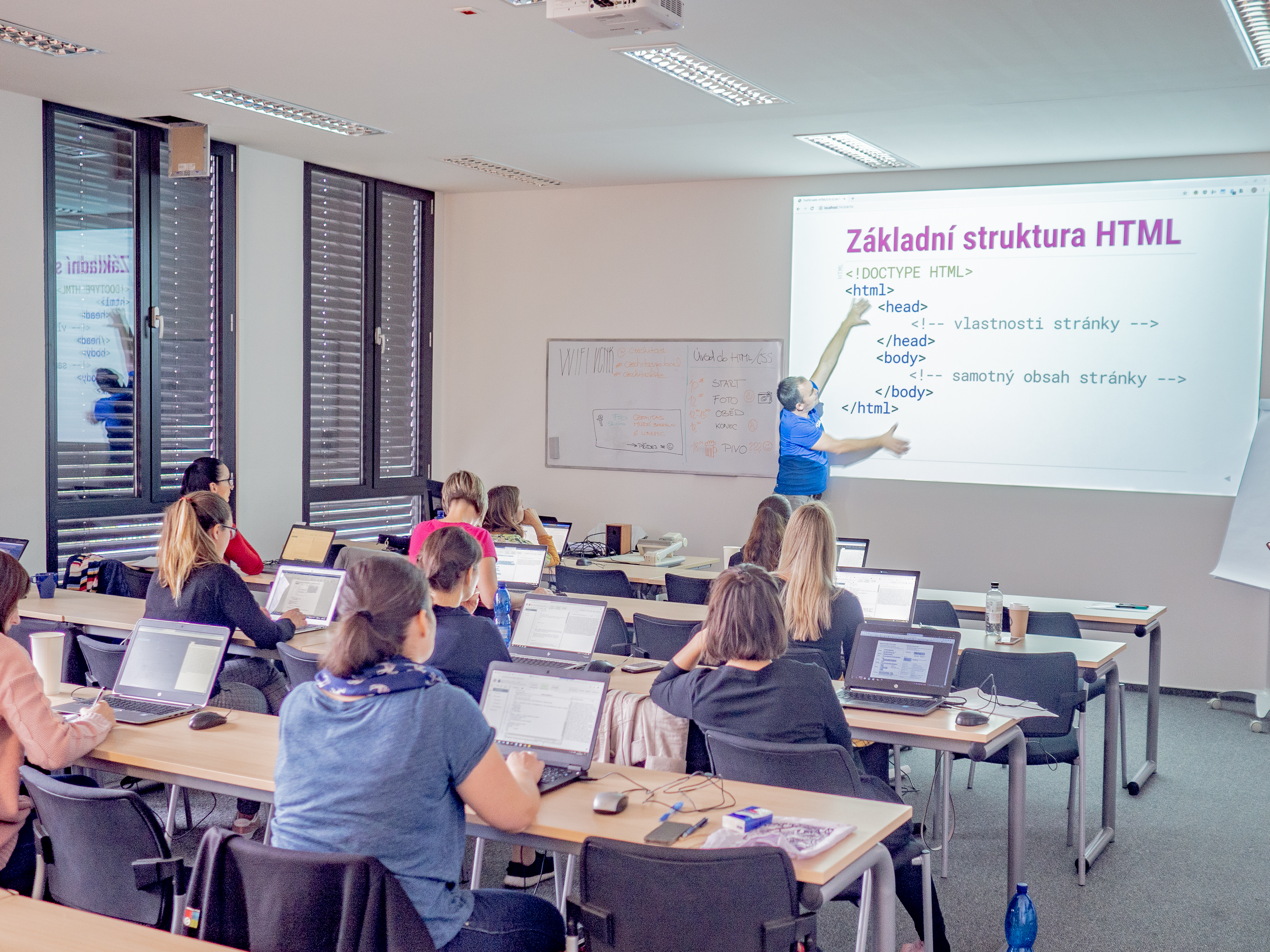
A Czechitas workshop

=== Czechitas ===
In 2015, Bühnová co-founded Czechitas, a non-profit organization created to teach women and girls how to code and to increase women's representation in technology. She would continue to work with Czechitas until her death, teaching coding courses and serving as a governing board member. As of 2022, Czechitas had taught coding and information technology skills to over 30,000 women and young people.

=== Later life and death ===
In May 2024, Bühnová received the Masaryk University Rector's Award for Volunteering for her work supporting non-profit organisations advocating for women in tech and IT education.

Bühnová died after a long illness on 5 December 2024, at the age of 43.
