= Meridiam =

Financial services company

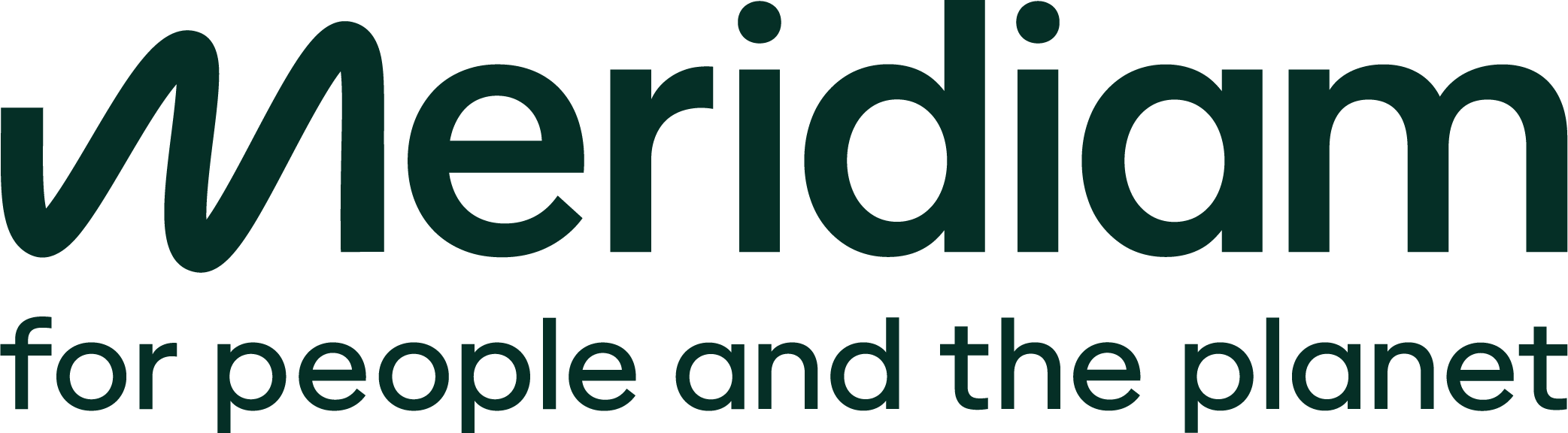
- Type: Société par Actions Simplifiée (SAS)
- Industry: fund management
- Founded: 2005
- Founder: Thierry Déau (CEO)
- Headquarters: Paris, France
- Number of locations: 10
- AUM: US$23 billion (December 2024)
- Owner: Thierry Déau and Meridiam's employees (80%) and Samsung Life Insurance (20%)
- Number of employees: 400 (2024)
- Website: meridiam.com

Meridiam is a global investor and asset manager based in Paris specialized in developing, financing and managing long-term public infrastructure projects. Founded in 2005, Meridiam invests in public infrastructure across Europe, Africa and the Americas.

Meridiam has offices in several countries (Paris, New York, Toronto, Istanbul, Addis Ababa, Dakar and Vienna), manages 23bn+ euros of assets and has to date invested in over a hundred transport, building and public services projects.

== History ==
=== 2005–2009: First fund and first investments ===
Meridiam was established in 2005 by Thierry Déau, formerly managing director of Egis Projets and head of Aecom Global Technology.

Set up to finance public infrastructure and to create a secure investment framework for long-term savings, Meridiam received the financial and operational support from the Crédit Agricole Group and AECOM Technology.

In 2006, while achieving the first closing of its fund Meridiam I, the company secured its first two projects: the Limerick Tunnel in Ireland, which began operating in July 2010, and the A5 highway in Austria, which opened to traffic in January 2010.

In 2007, Meridiam acquired the Fulcrum LIFT project covering local healthcare facilities in the United Kingdom, as part of large-scale program sponsored by the British Health Ministry.

In 2008, the company proceeded to a new fund-raising round for Meridiam I, which brought the fund size to €548 million. In the same year, Meridiam secured a stake in the A2 Motorway phase I project in Poland.

In 2009, the company won four new projects in Europe: the A5 Motorway in Germany, the A2 Motorway phase II in Poland, the R1 Motorway in Slovakia and the velodrome in Saint-Quentin-en-Yvelines, France. In the same year, Meridiam also secured two projects in the United States: the port of Miami Tunnel, inaugurated in May 2014 and the North Tarrant Express Highway in Texas, which began operating in October 2014.

Also in 2009, Infrastructure Investor selected Meridiam as European Fund of the Year.

=== 2010–2011: Continuation of investments in Europe and North America ===
While engaging a fund-raising process on both sides of the Atlantic (Meridiam Infrastructure Europe II and Meridiam Infrastructure North America II), Meridiam signed 6 new contracts between 2010 and 2011, including the new Montreal University Hospital Research Center (which opened in the fall of 2013), the Long Beach Courthouse (which opened in the fall of 2013) in California, the Nottingham Express Transit phase II (which began operating in May 2015), as well as the South-Europe Atlantique High-Speed rail line in France (which began operating in July 2017).

In 2011, Meridiam received the Fund of the Year award for its global achievements by Infrastructure Journal.

=== 2012–2013: Greater independence ===
In 2012, Meridiam set up a new supervisory board. The ownership structure was modified and resulted in the majority of shares being held by partners and employees. As of 2013, AECOM maintained thirty percent ownership in Meridiam.

In the same year, the closing of the funds Meridiam Infrastructure Europe II and Meridiam Infrastructure North America II increased the investment capacity of the company to $2.3 billion.

In order to finance the student housing facilities of the University of Hertfordshire (scheduled to open in September 2016), the company launched in 2013 the first project bond without credit enhancement in Europe. Simultaneously, Meridiam launched a partnership with the EDHEC Risk-Institute to support academic research. A new chair was established, dedicated to infrastructure equity investments, as well as to the recognition of infrastructure as a separate asset class.

This position was recently adopted by the European regulator EIOPA following a consultation.

=== 2014–2019: Development in Africa and new investments in Europe ===
In the first half of 2014, the company announced the fund-raising round of the first fund dedicated to the African continent, the Meridiam Infrastructure Africa Fund, targeting €300 million over a period of 15 years. In September 2015, the European Investment Bank announced its participation in this fund with an investment of €30 million.

In the same year, Meridiam opened an office in Istanbul and invested in four hospital projects in the country.

In February 2015, the company signed a concession contract reuniting the ports of Calais and Boulogne-sur-Mer and comprising the project Calais Port 2015. It is the first French public infrastructure project carried by France as part of the Juncker Plan.

Finally, in the context of the 2015 Paris Climate Conference organized in late 2015, Meridiam announced the launch of a new fund dedicated to infrastructure projects relating to energy transition.

At the beginning of 2016, Meridiam opened an office in Dakar.

=== 2020 and beyond: continuation of investments and takeover of SUEZ ===
In 2020, Meridiam is Veolia's partner in a takeover bid for SUEZ. Thierry Déau, founder CEO of Meridiam, is considered "the third man" within the framework of this project.

In October 2020, Meridiam becomes the majority shareholder of Voltalis, the European leader in active management and reduction of electricity consumption for individuals.

In December, Meridiam and Vinci concluded their public-private partnership contract for the D4 highway in the Czech Republic. This 28-year partnership represented an investment of around 600 million euros. The new highway improves the connection between South Bohemia and Prague, and helps improving traffic conditions on the country's main trade routes, especially to neighbouring Germany and Austria.

In May 2021, Calais port's extension project was completed, marking the end of the works on one of the largest construction sites in Europe. Meridiam, the Caisse des Dépôts, the Hauts-de-France Region CCI and the Grand Port Maritime de Dunkirk, as well as the Société des Ports du Détroit participated in this project.

In June 2021, the executive board of SUEZ and Veolia approved the promise to purchase filed by Meridiam, GIP and Groupe Caisse des Dépôts with CNP Assurances for the acquisition of the "new Suez". The Consortium of Investors is made up of Meridiam and GIP, each one holfing 40% of the capital, and the Caisse des Dépôts Group with CNP Assurances, holding 20% of the capital. The promise to purchase is subject to the waiver of certain precedent conditions, in particular to the approval of SUEZ shareholders and to obtaining the required regulatory authorizations.

Beginning of September 2021, Meridiam takes a 40% stake in Setrag, the concessionaire which operates "the Transgabonais"(Gabon's main railway line), alongside Comilog (a subsidiary of Eramet and the Gabonese State). Setrag is a vital infrastructure for the country's economy, which connects over approximately 650 km, from Franceville (3rd largest city of the country) to Libreville (capital city), to the port of Owendo.

At the end of September 2021, Meridiam, alongside its partners, Hydrogen de France (HDF) and SARA (limited company of the Antilles refinery, Rubis Group), launches the project for the West Guyana Power Plant (CEOG). This is currently the largest power plant project in the world, storing intermittent renewable energies using hydrogen.

Also in September 2021, Meridiam raises more than 5 billion euros for its future sustainable and impact investments. Its assets under management now stand at nearly €15 billion, an increase of around 80%. All new funds are classified under Article 9 of the European regulation on the disclosure of information relating to sustainable finance (SFDR), the highest standard for sustainable development.

In December 2023, Meridiam wins a contract to build and operate Togo’s second solar power plant & The European Investment Bank and showcase a new investment initiative at COP28 to protect vulnerable cities in Africa from climate change.

In January 2024, Meridiam closes transaction to increase ownership in New York’s LaGuardia Airport Terminal B. In March, Meridiam breaks ground in Selma, Alabama, on Transformative Fiber Infrastructure Project. The same month, Exoès partners with Bpifrance and Meridiam in a €35m deal to shape the future of electric mobility.

== Activities ==
Meridiam develops, finances, builds and manages various types of projects:

- Transport infrastructure (high-speed rail lines, highways, tunnels, ports, tramways, etc.)
- Social infrastructure (schools, universities, healthcare centres, stadiums, etc.)
- Public buildings (courthouses, government offices, ministries, etc.)
- Utility networks and services (water, waste management, energy, etc.)
- New sources of energy (solar, hydroelectric, geothermal energy, etc.)

Meridiam is present in 25 countries with offices located in 10 cities: Paris, Washington, D.C., Istanbul, Dakar, Luxembourg, Addis Ababa, Vienna, Amman, Libreville, and Johannesburg.

== Ethics and governance ==
Signatory of the United Nations’ Principles for Responsible Investment (PRI) since 2010, the company adopted since its inception an Ethics Charter focusing on environmental, social and governance issues.

In January 2012, Meridiam was the first investor and asset manager to receive ISO 9001 certification for its activity including it sustainable investment process.

Méridiam is certified by international standards and development banks which are integrated into the investment process and management of its portfolio.

=== List of international standards and benchmarks certifying Meridiam ===
- AFAQ ISO 37001 ANTI-BRIBERY
- AFAQ ISO 9001
- PRI

=== List of development banks certifying Meridiam ===
- European Investment Bank
- European Bank for Reconstruction and Development
- International Finance Corporation

The company has also included in its investments the United Nations Principles of Responsible Investment and the Equator Principles.

In December 2023, Meridiam obtains the international label of companies with a B Corp mission.

== Awards ==
Meridiam received the following awards :

- ”Infrastructure Fund of the year” (2015), ”European Ports Award” with the Calais Port 2015 project and the ”European Refinancing Award” with the B66 Benavente-Zamora project (2015) by the Infrastructure Journal.
- ”Global Infrastructure Fund of the Year” (2013), “Overall Infrastructure Fund of the Year” (2012), “Fund Manager of the Year – Global” (2011) and “Sponsor of the Year” (2009). by the Infrastructure Journal.
- ”European Infrastructure Fund Manager of the Year” by Infrastructure Investor (2012, 2011, 2010 and 2009).
- ”Global Financial Sponsor of the Year” by Project Finance (2009)
