= Hersh Chadha =

Indian photographer

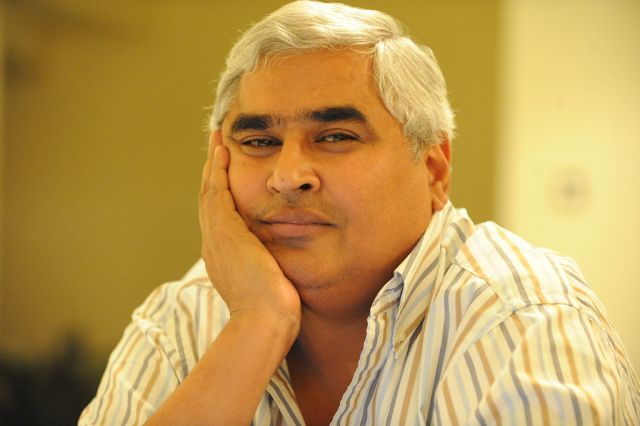
Hersh Chadha

Dr. Hersh Chadha (born 1957) is an Indian photographer.

== Publications ==
Chadha has authored Elements and Elements I, II and III, a series of photographic books that capture nature in its various moods. The proceeds from the sales of these books go to the World Wide Fund for Nature (WWF). Hersh Chadha: Visions of Nature, a book featuring a selection of his images of nature, followed the Elements series. Next up was With Ink & Film. In 2011, Chadha produced three new photographic books containing stunning examples of his art: Masterpiece, which highlights some 235 places he has visited; Y.O.U., which celebrates the beauty of women; and Patterns, which examines the similarity between the patterns of nature and patterns of man.

His book Masterpiece now features in the 2015 edition of the Limca Book of Records under the category "Photo book of most cities by the same photographer", for having launched a photo book titled Masterpiece, covering 235 cities.

In 2013, Chadha commissioned three of his photography internship students from Kyiv, Ukraine, to complete different photographic projects, which involved photography, e-books, multimedia presentation, coffee table book, and exhibits. The first book, Urban Beauty by Andrey Kvasov, covers major cities of Europe, bringing out their beauty in urban and traditional architecture, people, bridges, and transportation. The second book, The Essence by Maria Savoskula, is about cell photography and features images of plant, animal and human cells as abstract art. The third book, India by Foot, by Sergey Polezhaka, features images taken while traveling across the length and breadth of India in a limited time frame and portrays India in its different shades and nuances.

Chadha is an associate of the Royal Photographic Society (ARPS), awarded for exhibiting a high degree of proficiency and demonstrating technical and visual competence in photography. He has also been actively involved with World Press Photo. In Dubai, he ran a global network of business activities.

== Concerns ==
Chadha's concern for the environment and human impact on it have led him to focus on critical issues such as the preservation of wildlife, the protection of rain forests, the ozone layer and pollution. He has worked with a number of wildlife agencies concerned with conservation of Arabian wildlife – including the Arabian Leopard Trust and the Environmental Research and Wildlife Development Agency (ERWDA) – and has made significant photographic contributions to these agencies.

Chadha considers philanthropy as a necessary tool in contributing to human development. Education is one of the focal points in the framework of his philanthropic activity. His internship program in Dubai provides opportunities for professional training, to students from around the world, in the fields of digital photography and photographic modeling. Chadha has interned over 95 students in photography and modelling from various countries. The Hersh Chadha Foundation has sponsored the education of over 200 students worldwide across multiple universities, by providing them with scholarship grants. In addition, he contributes to various charities and supports upcoming sportsmen and sportswomen.

== Far and wide ==
Chadha's desire to establish photography as an art form saw him institute an annual award at the prestigious Institute of Journalism at Taras Shevchenko Kyiv University. He was a visiting professor there, as well as at the American University of Central Asia in Bishkek, Kyrgyzstan; the Kyrgyzstan National University; and the Institute of Foreign Languages at the International University of Kyrgyzstan. In 2009 the Taras Shevchenko National University celebrated its 175th anniversary and, on this occasion, Chadha was bestowed the title of honorary professor. In February 2014, the Kyiv National University of Technologies and Design awarded Chadha an honorary doctorate. In November 2016, the American University of Central Asia (AUCA), Bishkek, awarded him the title of honorary professor.

Chadha has provided support for the establishment of infrastructure for the students of the Journalism and Mass Communications program at the media lab of the new campus of American University of Central Asia (AUCA) in Bishkek, Kyrgyzstan, and set up a state-of-the-art photography lab at the Kyiv National University of Technologies and Design in Ukraine. He has provided financial grants to several students of the faculty of Journalism at the AUCA. Chadha has also helped the Maldives National University (MNU) establish close links with the American University of Sharjah, by funding the study trip of the Maldives National University faculty to the UAE, and helped MNU by sponsoring a faculty member of the journalism department for a period of six months.

In 2015, Chadha, in association with the Department of Photojournalism at the American University Central Asia in Bishkek, Kyrgyzstan, organized a student photography competition and nominated the winner, Talgat Subanaliev, for the photography expedition to Antarctica. In February 2016, Talgat undertook a 10-day voyage across Antarctica along with researchers and photographers from around the world. The trip was organized and fully sponsored by Chadha.

On 19 October 2016, five of his pictures of flowers were carried to the International Space Station by the crew of Expedition 49/50.

On 1 June 2017, Chadha was the honorary guest at the ceremony to welcome cosmonauts back from the mission, which took place at the YU.A. Gagarin Research and Test Cosmonaut Training Center in Star City, Moscow. He was given a certificate, confirming that five of his photographs were delivered to the International Space Station on 21 October 2016 and continue to be displayed in the ISS. Chadha is the first person to organize a photography exhibition in space.

In June 2017, he was invited to become a member of the Constituent Assembly of The Global Council for Tolerance and Peace. In July 2017, he attended meetings at the United Nations as a member of the delegation for signing the memorandum of understanding between the Global Council for Tolerance and Peace and the United Nations.

On 2 August 2017, Chadha gave the keynote speech at the World Communication Association (WCA)’s biennial conference held at the American University of Central Asia (AUCA) in Bishkek, Kyrgyzstan. The topic of the conference was "World Conflicts and Disasters: Communication, Culture and Resolution".

Chadha donated money towards the construction of a sakura garden at the Kyiv National University of Technology and Design (KNUTD) in Kyiv, Ukraine, which will consist of 21 sakura trees for the benefit of their students. On 18 September 2017, he planted a sakura tree in the park of KNUTD to launch the project.

External videos
- YouTube video:: Ms. Olga Photographed by Prof. Hersh Chadha, Kyiv (Ms. Olga Photographed by Prof. Hersh Chadha, Kyiv 2009)

== Memberships ==
- The 1001: A Nature Trust (WWF International)
- American Society of Media Photographers (ASMP)
- The Harvard Alumni Society of the UAE
- The Stanford Business School Alumni Association
- The Royal Photographic Society of Great Britain
- Honorary Member of the Union of Photo Artists, Ukraine
- The Managing Committee, The Delhi Private School, Dubai
- International Who's Who of Professionals
- The National Geographic Society
- The University Council of American University of Central Asia, Bishkek, Kyrgyzstan
