= Theodor Weimer =

German business executive

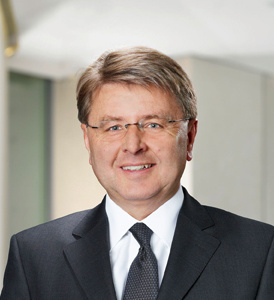
- Theodor Weimer in 2012
- Born: December 21, 1959 (age 66); Franconia, Germany
- Education: University of Bonn
- Occupation: Banker
- Known for: CEO of Deutsche Börse AG
- Children: 2

Theodor Weimer (born 21 December 1959 in Wertheim am Main) is a German manager who served as CEO of Deutsche Börse AG from 2018 to 2024. Prior to that, he was spokesman of the management board of Unicredit Bank AG (Germany) – known under the brand name HypoVereinsbank – from January 2009 to the end of 2017 and in this capacity he was also a member of the executive management committee of Unicredit Group, Milan (Italy).

== Education ==
Weimer graduated from the Wirtschaftsgymnasium of the Berufliche Schulzentrum Wertheim. Afterwards he studied economics, business administration and geography at the University of Tübingen (Germany). As part of his studies he spent a guest semester at the University of St. Gallen (Switzerland). After completing his studies, Theodor Weimer worked as an assistant to Horst Albach's chair at the University of Bonn (Germany), where he also wrote his doctoral thesis in mathematical organization theory, and received his doctorate in 1987 with the distinction "magna cum laude".

== Career ==
Weimer started his professional career directly after his dissertation in 1988 at McKinsey & Company as a management consultant in the Düsseldorf office (Germany). In 1995, he moved to the competitor Bain & Company, Inc. in Munich (Germany), where he became a director (senior partner) and was appointed to the Global Management Committee in Boston (US). As a management consultant, Weimer has served clients from the financial sector in particular. Between 2001 and 2007 Weimer worked for Goldman Sachs Inc. in Frankfurt (Germany) in their Investment Banking Division. He started as managing director and was appointed partner in the Investment Banking Division in 2004. He was responsible for financial services clients in German-speaking countries.

In June 2007, Weimer joined Unicredit Group and worked for its subsidiary HypoVereinsbank in Munich (Germany) as head of global investment banking in the Markets & Investment Banking division. Since joining the Unicredit Group, he was also a member of the executive committee for Markets & Investment Banking of the Milan Group. In April 2008, the bank appointed him spokesman designate of the Board of Managing Directors of Bayerische Hypo- und Vereinsbank AG. Weimer took over the position of spokesman of the management board of HypoVereinsbank (since 15 December 2009: Unicredit Bank AG) on 1 January 2009 from the outgoing spokesman of the Management Board Wolfgang Sprissler and in this context moved up to the Management Committee of Unicredit Milan (Italy) as country chairman Germany. In 2010, Weimer initiated the foundation of the HVB Women's advisory board, of which he was patron until 2017. In 2011, Weimer was appointed a member of the group's Business Executive Committee and in March 2013 to the Executive Management Committee of Unicredit.

On January 1, 2018, Weimer took over as CEO of Deutsche Börse AG from Carsten Kengeter. During his time in office, he sought a series of smaller acquisitions, succeeding in buying Danish investment management software company SimCorp and Institutional Shareholder Services but failing in an approach for Borsa Italiana.

== Other activities ==
=== Corporate boards ===
- Knorr-Bremse, member of the supervisory board (since 2020)
- Deutsche Bank, member of the supervisory board (2020-2025)
- FC Bayern München AG, Munich (Germany) (2014-2020) FC (2014-2020)

=== Non-profit organizations ===
- Member of the Exchange Experts Commission (since 2018)
- Member of the executive committee of ICC Germany, International Chamber of Commerce (since 2018)
- Member of the foundation board of the Frankfurt School of Finance & Management (since 2018)
- Member of the board of trustees of Ecosense - Forum for Sustainable Development of German Business (since 2018)
- Member of the board of trustees of the Friends of the Berliner Philharmoniker e.V. (since 2018)
- Member of the board of trustees (Opera Section) of the Frankfurter Patronatsverein für die Städtischen Bühnen e.V. (since 2018)
- Member of the board of trustees of the Rheingau Musik Festival (since 2018)
- Member of the board of trustees of the Hessischer Kreis e.V. (since 2020)

== Personal life ==
Born in Franconia, Weimer is married and has two daughters. He plays the piano.
