= J. T. Ross Jackson =

Danish-Canadian economist, author and philanthropist

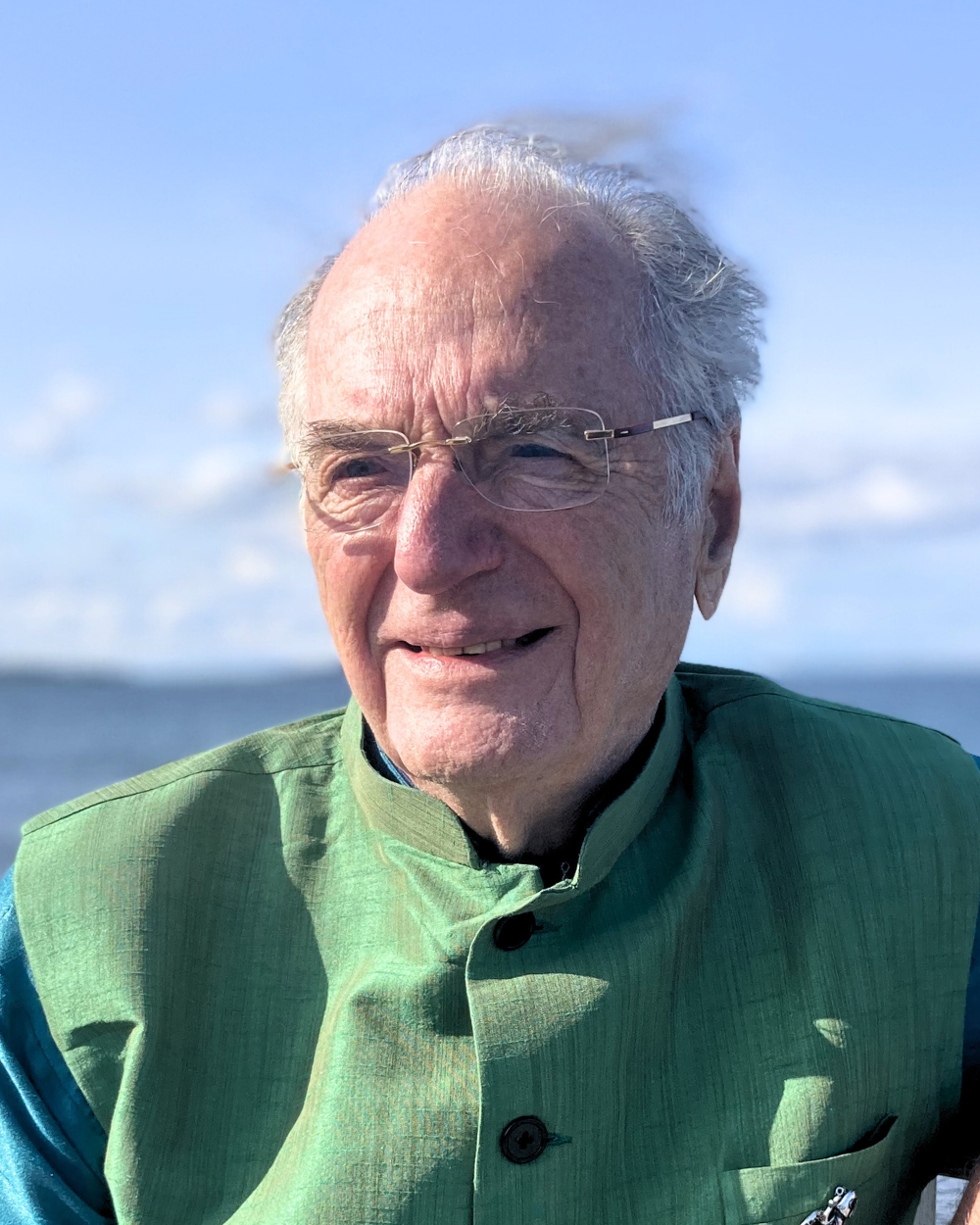
J.T. Ross Jackson

James Thomas Ross Jackson is a Danish-Canadian economist, author and philanthropist born in Ottawa, Canada in 1938. In 1971, J.T. Ross Jackson co-founded SimCorp A/S: one of the world's first financial engineering companies. Later, Jackson began focusing more on international finance, consulting around the world in investment strategies for banks, insurance companies, and mutual fund providers. This led J. T. Ross Jackson to research currency trading methods and the creation of various investment strategies.

In the early 1980s, J. T. Ross Jackson traveled to India and met Muktananda, a Hindu swami whose teaching led Jackson to an epiphany.

"I felt a divine connection," he says. "Material things meant less after that."

J. T. Ross Jackson has described his awakening in the book, Kali Yuga Odyssey: A Spiritual Journey (San Francisco, Robert D. Reed, 2000). In 1987 he integrated his spiritual insights with his business and environmental interests by forming Gaia Trust, a charitable Danish entity with the mandate to support people and projects that are moving the planet towards sustainability through grants and proactive initiatives.

"As a thinker, entrepreneur, author, activist and chair of a Danish foundation that supports renewable energy and sustainable living, Ross Jackson is trying to steer humanity on a different, more nature-oriented way of life." - The Complete Engineer, The magazine of the Faculty of Engineering and applied science at Queen’s University. Winter Edition 2011

== Gaia Trust ==
Gaia Trust was a Danish-based charitable association founded in 1987 on the initiative of Ross and Hildur Jackson, with the intention of supporting the transition to a sustainable and more spiritual future society through grants and proactive initiatives. In 2024, Gaia Trust was closed after using up its capital as planned from the beginning.

Ross was Chairman of Gaia Trust since its foundation. The first major project was to support the people on the ground who were actually trying to live sustainably and lead by example. In 1991 J.T. Ross Jackson co-founded the Global Ecovillage Network (GEN) together with his wife Hildur Jackson. GEN — The Global Ecovillage Network was formally founded at Findhorn Ecovillage, Scotland, in October 1995 with financial support from Gaia Trust. The next major NGO project initiated by Gaia Trust evolved out of GEN in 1998 and was largely inspired by Ross Jackson's wife Hildur. It came to be known as Gaia Education, which was formally founded in 2005 at Findhorn Ecovillage and is an educational curriculum for the sustainable design of communities, available both face-to-face and online in three languages at this time, now expanding into applying SDGs and promoting Gaia Schools.

In the foreword to J.T. Ross Jackson's book And We ARE Doing It: Building an Ecovillage Future (San Francisco, Robert D. Reed, 2000) David C. Korten, author of "When Corporations Rule the World" writes:

“… Ross leads an unusual double life. In the world of global finance, he is known as the board chair of GaiaCorp, a leading manager of currency-based hedge funds and advisor to international financial institutions on foreign exchange management. In the world of environmental activism, he is known as the board chair of Gaia Trust, a visionary grant-making foundation that has expended more than $15 million in GaiaCorp profits to support groups around the world pioneering the development of ecovillages and green enterprises as the foundation of 21st-century civilization. … While it is not uncommon for successful entrepreneurs who create large personal fortunes to eventually turn their attention to philanthropy, Ross is distinctive in that he established GaiaCorp for the primary explicit purpose of generating profits to finance progressive social change.”

Gaia Trust has always been self-funded by earnings from its very successful daughter company Gaiacorp, a foreign currency manager and advisory firm. The basis for Gaiacorp’s business was software and research donated to Gaia Trust by J.T. Ross Jackson, who retained 10% of the shares for the first five years. The announced intention from the beginning was to sell off Gaiacorp after about 10 years in order to free up capital for the charitable activities, and this sale was indeed completed in 2000, where Gaiacorp was sold to The Appleton Group.

Gaia Trust’s strategy has always been two-pronged with yin and yang components. The yin component was to support the ecovillage movement through grants, while the yang component was to invest its capital in “green” startup companies that would complement the grants policy, creating jobs and promoting more sustainable businesses.

The major projects resulting were the establishment of the Global Ecovillage Network and Gaia Education and a venture capital firm Gaia Technologies A/S. Over 300 grants have been made to projects in over 30 countries.

The board of directors of Gaia Trust comprised J.T. Ross Jackson (chair), Lars Kjeldsen, Flemming Jensen and Peter Pruzan.

== Green Investments ==
Besides the IT consulting companies and his financial consulting business that characterized most of J.T. Ross Jackson’s professional career, he continues to take an active part in companies with a double purpose, sustainability, and financial viability. The most successful has been Gaia Trusts' investment in Urtekram. The company was early out (1972) as a major Scandinavian organic foods wholesaler, but was continually in financial difficulties and close to bankruptcy. Ross personally, along with Gaia Trust, took over 2/3 of the company in 1995, brought in a professional management team, and turned it around over the next 20 years with a net turnover of almost DKK 400 million. Urtekram A/s was sold to Midsona AB, Sweden, in 2015 as a well-consolidated and profitable firm. Ross Jackson says the following about the sale:

"By making healthy organic products Urtekram every day contributes to a better environment. I am happy together with Gaia Trust to have contributed to the success of a sound and profitable green company in Denmark"

For many years, Ross hoped that some traditional developers would discover the potential in ecovillages and bring a professional approach to the concept, so ecovillages could become mainstream and not take 8–10 years for a small group of amateurs to get from concept to actually move in.

A second recent green start-up is Nerve Smart Systems, a technology company specializing in advanced battery technology with the goal of making industrial batteries far more efficient and long-living. Ross is the major shareholder and member of the board.

== Family ==
Ross married Hildur, a Danish law graduate (1967) with postgraduate studies in cultural sociology, in 1967. They have three children (Rolf, 1968), (Thor Leif, 1969) and Frej (1979) and seven grandchildren. Hildur and Ross were equal partners from the beginning of Gaia Trust’s activities. Hildur died of cancer in 2015. In 2022 Ross married Heather, a British artist. They live at Duemosegaard, a regenerative farm near Copenhagen.

== Early life and education ==
Ross was born in 1938 in Hamilton, Ontario, Canada (full name James Thomas Ross Jackson) and lived in Ottawa, Ontario for most of his youth. His father was a flying instructor and psychologist, working for the Canadian Defense Department, later as secretary to the Joint Chiefs of Staff. After matriculating from Fisher Park High School, Ross won a four-year scholarship to study engineering at Carleton University, Ottawa, where he was elected president of the Engineering Society in his sophomore year. After his sophomore year he transferred to Queen's University, Kingston, Ontario, where he was elected president of the Engineering Society at the much larger university and graduated cum laude in engineering physics in 1960. Ross won a scholarship to pursue a master's degree at Purdue University's Krannert School of Management in Lafayette, Indiana. After receiving his M.S., he won a systems research scholarship to study Operations Research under Professor Russell Ackoff at Case Western Reserve University in Cleveland, Ohio. He completed his PhD in financial engineering in 1964, his focus was on the virgin area of stock options, 10 years before the CBOE existed.

== Books by J.T. Ross Jackson ==
Ross has written articles and books on a variety of topics, including his personal transformation from businessman to environmental activist, on economics, on politics, on his spiritual journey, and a "documented novel" on the incredible life of Francis Bacon as the author of the Shakespeare works and the son of Queen Elizabeth I.

One of J.T. Ross Jackson books Occupy World Street: A global roadmap for radical economic and political reform (Vermont, Chelsea Green, 2012) inspired the development of a new political party in Denmark. The founder of The Alternative Uffe Elbæk gives credit to Ross Jacksons book as one of the books that changed his political view and made him create the green political party. Ross Jackson donated DKK 2 million to The Alternatives election campaign in 2015.

In 2024, Ross published a sequel to “Occupy World Street” titled THE BAD NEWS & THE GOOD NEWS, with a continued focus on global governance. While the first book dealt with the international aspects of Ross’ vision for the future, the second book deals with the national aspects, with a particular focus on the economic system. Ross also write articles on the same subjects, which can be read on his homepage:

- When No Means Yes: Danish Visions of a Different Europe (Hanne Norup Carlsen, J.T. Ross Jackson, Niels I. Meyer, ed. (London, Adamantine Press, 1993)
- And We ARE Doing It: Building an Ecovillage Future (San Francisco, Robert D. Reed, 2000)
- Kali Yuga Odyssey: A Spiritual Journey(San Francisco, Robert D. Reed, 2000)
- Gaian Economics: Jonathan Dawson, Ross Jackson, Helena Norberg-Hodge (ed.), (Gaia Education, 2014)
- Shaker of the Speare: The Francis Bacon Story (U.K., Book Guild Publishing, 2005)
- The Companion to Shaker of the Speare: The Francis Bacon Story(U.K., Book Guild Publishing, 2005)
- Occupy World Street: A global roadmap for radical economic and political reform (Vermont, Chelsea Green, 2012)
- THE BAD NEWS & THE GOOD NEWS: The Economics of Collapse and The Birth of a Regenerative Society (Green Venture ApS, 2024)
