= Peter Pruzan =

Danish organizational theorist, management consultant and Emeritus Professor

Peter Mark Pruzan (born 1936 in the United States) is a Danish organizational theorist, management consultant, and Emeritus Professor of Systems Science at the Department of Management, Politics & Philosophy at the Copenhagen Business School (CBS) in Denmark. Pruzan is known for work on corporate governance and values-based leadership. He became a naturalized Danish citizen in 1973.

== Education and career ==
Pruzan obtained his BA cum laude in 1957 from Princeton University, his MBA with Distinction in 1959 from Harvard University, his PhD in 1964 from Case Western Reserve University, and an advanced post-doctoral degree in Economics in 1982 from the University of Copenhagen.

In the early 1960s, Pruzan started his career as adviser to IBM Denmark on Operations Research and as a management consultant in Denmark and Sweden. In 1964 he was appointed Associate Professor at the Institute of Mathematical Statistics and Operations Research, Technical University of Denmark.

In 1967, he co-founded and led OAC, Operations Analysis Corp., an international consultancy specializing in Operations Research and in 1971 he co-founded SimCorp (currently listed on the NASDAQ OMX Nordic Exchange) that provides specialized software and financial expertise for the investment management industry; he no longer has any connection with or financial interest in the company. In 1976 he returned to academia as Associate Professor of Economic Planning at the University of Copenhagen.

From 1985 to 2003, he was Professor of Systems Science at the Copenhagen Business School where he was co-founder of the Department of Management, Politics and Philosophy as well as of bachelors and masters programs in Philosophy and Economics and in Mathematics and Economics. His research focus while at CBS was to integrate perspectives from management, philosophy, and spirituality to develop values-based approaches to leadership and ethics.

Among his organizational initiatives while at CBS were co-founding and designing the think tank and advisory services firm AccountAbility (London, 1995); CBS’s Center for Corporate Social Responsibility (2002) and the Academy of Business in Society (Bruxelles, 2002). Since his retirement in 2003, he has taught Research Methodology to PhD students in India and lectured internationally on spiritual-based leadership.

He has authored 15 books and roughly 150 articles in international scientific journals as well as lectured frequently in Europe, the US, and India, originally on operations research and then on values in the workplace, organizational ethics, social and ethical accounting, and corporate responsibility and, since the turn of the century, focusing mainly on spiritual-based leadership.

== Publications ==
=== Selected books ===
- Pruzan, Peter (2016). Research Methodology: The Aims, Practices and Ethics of Science. Switzerland: Springer. ISBN 978-3-319-27167-5.
- Pruzan, P. (2009). Rational, Ethical, and Spiritual Perspectives on Leadership: Selected writings. Oxford: Peter Lang.
- Pruzan, P.; Pruzan Mikkelsen, K. (2007). Leading with Wisdom: Spiritual-based leadership in business. Sheffield: Greenleaf.
- Zadek, P.; Pruzan, P.; Evans, R. (1997). Building Corporate Accountability: Emerging practices in social and ethical accounting, auditing, and reporting. London: Earthscan.
- Bogetoft, P.; Pruzan, P. (1997). Planning with Multiple Criteria : Investigation, communication and choice (2. ed.). Copenhagen: Copenhagen Business School Press.
- Jensen, HS.; Pruzan, P.; Thyssen, O. (1990). The Ethical Challenge: On shared values in a pluralistic society (in Danish). Copenhagen: Copenhagen Business School Press.
- Pruzan, P. (1981). Locational Decisions and Discrete Optimization. Copenhagen: University of Copenhagen.
- Pruzan, Peter Mark (1964). An Application of Control Theory to National Economic Planning. Cleveland: Case Institute of Technology.

=== Selected articles ===
- Pruzan, Peter (2015). Zsolnai, L. (ed.). "Spiritual-Based Leadership: A Paradox of Pragmatism". The Spiritual Dimension of Business Ethics and Sustainability Management. New York: Springer: 169–173.
- Pruzan, Peter (2015). Ims, K.J.; Pedersen, L.J.T. (eds.). "The Source of Ethical Competency: Eastern Perspectives Provided by a Westerner". Business Ethics and the Greater Good: Rethinking Business in an Age of Crisis. Cheltenham, UK: Edward Elgar: 117–148.
- Pruzan, P. (2011). Bouckaert, L.; Zsolnai, L. (eds.). "Spiritual-Based Leadership". The Palgrave Handbook of Spirituality and Business. London: Palgrave: 287–295. ISBN 9780230238312.
- Pruzan, P.; Miller, W. (2006). Maak, T.; Pless, N. (eds.). "Spirituality as the Basis of Responsible Leaders and Responsible Companies". Responsible Leadership. London: Routledge: 68–92.
- Pruzan, P. (2004). Zsolnai, L. (ed.). "Spirituality as the Context for Leadership". Spirituality and Ethics in Management. Issues in Business Ethics. 19. London: Kluwer: 15–31. doi:10.1007/1-4020-2365-0_2. ISBN 978-1-4020-2364-4.
- Pruzan, P. (2001). "The Question of Organizational Consciousness: Can Organizations have Values, Virtues and Visions?". Journal of Business Ethics. 29 (3): 271–284. doi:10.1023/A:1026577604845. S2CID 41026134.
- Pruzan, P. (1998). "From Control to Values-based Management and Accountability". Journal of Business Ethics. 17 (13): 1379–1394. doi:10.1023/A:1006079110633. S2CID 151190210.
- Pruzan, P.; Zadek, S. (1997). "Socially Responsible and Accountable Enterprise". Journal of Human Values. 3: 59–79. doi:10.1177/097168589700300106. S2CID 145693744.
- Pruzan, P. (1995). "The Ethical Accounting Statement". World Business Academy Perspectives: 35–46.
- Pruzan, P.; Thyssen, O. (1990). "Conflict and Consensus: Ethics as a Shared Value Horizon for Strategic Planning". Human Systems Management. 9 (3): 135–151. doi:10.3233/HSM-1990-9303.
- Pruzan, P. (1979). "The Bangladesh Grain Model". European Journal of Operational Research. 3 (2): 110–121. doi:10.1016/0377-2217(79)90097-3.
- Pruzan, P. (1966). Lawrence, J.R. (ed.). "Is Cost-Benefit Analysis Consistent with the Maximization of Expected Utility?". Operational Research and the Social Sciences. London: Tavistock Publications: 319–336.
