= Ann-Kristin Achleitner =

German economist

Ann-Kristin Achleitner (née Koberg) is a German economist, currently a professor at Technical University of Munich.

== Career ==
Before taking on her current position, Achleitner held an Endowed Chair for Banking and Finance at EBS University of Business and Law from 1995 to 2001 and Honorary Professor at EBS from 2002 to 2013. She is a member of acatech.

In addition, Achleiter serves on the Government Commission on the German Corporate Governance Codex and on the Economic Council of the Embassy of France in Berlin. In her hometown Munich, she shares an office with her husband Paul Achleitner, Michael Diekmann, Joachim Faber and Peter Löscher.

== Other activities ==
=== Corporate boards ===
- DHL Group, Member of the Supervisory Board (since 2024)
- Lazard, Member of the Board of Directors (since 2021)
- Techem, Member of the advisory board (since 2020)
- Investcorp, Member of the International Advisory Board (since 2018)
- Linde, Member of the supervisory board (since 2011)
- Munich Re, Member of the supervisory board (2013–2024)
- Deutsche Börse, Member of the supervisory board (2016–2019), Member of the Nomination and Strategy Committees
- Engie, Member of the Board of Directors (2012–2019), Chair of the Committee for Ethics, the Environment and Sustainable Development (2016–2019)
- Metro AG, Member of the supervisory board (2011–2017)
- Vontobel, Member of the Board of Directors (2009–2013)
- Depfa Bank, Member of the supervisory board (1996–2001)

=== Non-profit organizations ===
- German Startups Association, Member of the Board of Trustees (since 2019)
- Ifo Institute for Economic Research, Member of the Board of Trustees
- Trilateral Commission, Member of the European Group
- World Economic Forum (WEF), Member of the Europe Policy Group (since 2017)
- Fraunhofer Society, Member of the Senate (2008–2013)
- Rationalisierungs- und Innovationszentrum der Deutschen Wirtschaft, Member of the Board of Trustees (2004–2007)

== Personal life ==
Achleitner is married to Paul Achleitner. They live in Munich
