= Tobias Reichmuth =

Swiss entrepreneur and investor

Tobias Reichmuth (born 13 November 1978) is a Swiss entrepreneur and investor.

== Biography ==
Reichmuth began his career in the financial sector. In 2009, he founded SUSI Partners, an asset management firm specializing in renewable energy and climate infrastructure. He co-founded Crypto Finance AG, a financial services provider for digital assets, acquired by Deutsche Börse Group in 2021.

In 2020, Reichmuth co-founded Maximon, a longevity-focused incubator that builds startups in the fields of healthy aging and cell rejuvenation. He is also a co-founder of The Singularity Group and established the Crypto Finance Conference in St. In 2024, he was noted for co-founding the Longevity Investors Conference in Gstaad, Switzerland.

Reichmuth studied business administration at the University of St. Gallen, where he also completed the CEMS Master in International Management program. He later earned a Doctorate in Economics (Dr. rer. pol.) at the European Business School in Oestrich-Winkel in 2012.

== Publications ==
- Reichmuth, Tobias; Ewald, Collin Y. (2022-04-07). "Ten simple rules for building a successful science start-up". PLOS Computational Biology. 18 (4) e1009982. Public Library of Science. doi:10.1371/journal.pcbi.1009982. ISSN 1553-7358. PMC 8989209. PMID 35389985.
- Reichmuth, T., ed. (2014). Die Finanzierung der Energiewende in der Schweiz: Bestandsaufnahme, Massnahmen, Investitionsmöglichkeiten (in German). Zürich: Verlag Neue Zürcher Zeitung. ISBN 978-3-03823-856-0.

== Awards and recognition ==
- In 2026, Reichmuth was named Founder of the Year by the University of St. He has also been listed among the 300 richest people in Switzerland by the business magazine Bilanz.
