= Project Santorini =

Historical controversial transaction

Project Santorini was the internal name given to a structured financing transaction executed in December 2008 between Deutsche Bank AG and Banca Monte dei Paschi di Siena (MPS), the world's oldest bank, and to a wider series of similar transactions. The affair became the subject of Italian criminal proceedings, a regulatory dispute between Deutsche Bank and Germany's BaFin, and subsequent civil litigation in Germany and the United Kingdom totalling in excess of £850 million in claimed damages. It has been described as one of the most significant banking controversies in post-financial crisis Europe.

== Background ==
=== Monte dei Paschi di Siena ===
Banca Monte dei Paschi di Siena, founded in 1472, is the world's oldest bank. By late 2008, MPS faced financial difficulties arising from its costly acquisition of rival bank Antonveneta and sought structured financing from Deutsche Bank. In January 2013, Bloomberg News first publicly reported the existence of the Santorini transaction, based on documents obtained by its reporters.

=== Deutsche Bank's enhanced repo business ===
From 2007, Deutsche Bank marketed a financial product known as a repo-to-maturity or enhanced repo to a range of institutional clients including foreign banks, the French state railway, and Spanish supermarket chains. Under these arrangements, Deutsche Bank made long-term structured loans using government bonds as collateral. A technique known as netting allowed Deutsche Bank to offset the loan and bond positions against each other, removing the loan from its balance sheet. Across a portfolio of over 100 such transactions, this accounting treatment removed approximately €11 billion of loan exposure from Deutsche Bank's balance sheet. Deutsche Bank's own accountants acknowledged at the time that no other major bank applied netting in the same way to such transactions. The Milan Court of Appeal later found that both Deutsche Bank's Finance division and its external auditor KPMG had at the time "considered completely indifferent with respect to the accrual accounting of the transaction" the very features that Deutsche Bank would later claim justified a restatement.

== The Santorini transaction ==
On 1 December 2008, Deutsche Bank's most senior internal risk committee, the Global Markets Risk Assessment Committee (GMRAC), unanimously approved the Santorini transaction following a full presentation by the deal team. The deal was a structured enhanced repo in which Deutsche Bank made a long-term loan to MPS using Italian government bonds as collateral, with Deutsche Bank sourcing the bonds through an intermediary — a feature known as "bond sourcing." The transaction was restructured in July 2009, with new longer-maturity bonds replacing the original collateral; the restructured transaction remained on Deutsche Bank's books until December 2013. The Milan Court of Appeal subsequently found that Santorini "was not an anomalous transaction, nor was it tailor-made" for MPS; that it was "a typical product offered by Deutsche Bank to its clients, constructed as a repo to maturity with embedded derivatives" and sold to many counterparties; and that it "produced positive economic results" for MPS, interrupted only by Deutsche Bank's own 2013 reclassification. In 2010, Christian Sewing, then serving as Deutsche Bank's chief credit officer, was part of a committee that approved a similar €1.5 billion enhanced repo transaction with UniCredit. Documents seen by the Financial Times show that Sewing was directly involved in obtaining executive board approval for the trade; an internal email from October 2010 records Sewing telling colleagues: "Unicredito was approved by the Board."

== Regulatory pressure and the 2013 restatement ==
From 2011, Deutsche Bank came under intensifying scrutiny from the US Federal Reserve and Germany's BaFin regarding its balance sheet treatment of enhanced repo transactions. The Fed subpoenaed Deutsche Bank in March 2012 after six months of insufficient cooperation. BaFin simultaneously questioned whether the transactions constituted balance sheet "window dressing." On 22 October 2013, Deutsche Bank's Management Board resolved to restate the Santorini transaction and similar transactions with approximately 36 other counterparties, reclassifying them from loans to derivatives. The bank attributed the restatement to the purported discovery of new facts: specifically, that the deal team had failed to disclose bond sourcing to Deutsche Bank's Finance division, causing incorrect accounting. BaFin responded by calling the bank's explanation "totally implausible" and "unacceptable," and its head of large bank supervision characterised the transactions as "a deliberate business strategy pursued by management." The Milan Court of Appeal later found that internal Deutsche Bank communications from 18 October 2013 — four days before the board resolution — recorded Finance and Legal representatives agreeing to "beef up" the explanation for the restatement; that Deutsche Bank's Finance division "was fully aware that Deutsche Bank was selling the bonds to the counterparty of the repo and that, therefore, it was not realistic that in October 2013 they would suddenly discover the existence of what was an established practice"; and that Deutsche Bank "deliberately chose to reassess Santorini and 36 other transactions as derivatives in order to allow the accounting functions to circumvent the possible repercussions on Deutsche Bank's financial statements resulting from the interpretative issues raised by the Fed." The court also noted a "disturbing circumstance" regarding an 18 October 2013 internal email that had been filed in the first instance proceedings following a prosecutorial request, but had been produced by Deutsche Bank "in a form that did not report the words present near the right margin of the email, thus preventing it from being understood" — words which, once visible, showed Finance representatives agreeing to fabricate a stronger justification for the restatement.

== The Group Audit investigation ==
In November 2013, Deutsche Bank's CFO Stefan Krause commissioned an internal Group Audit investigation. According to Der Spiegel, which obtained the statement of claim in subsequent litigation, Krause emailed Sewing on 13 November 2013: "I was tasked to ask you to get on this immediately." Sewing, who had become Head of Group Audit in June 2013, oversaw the resulting investigation. The Milan Court of Appeal later found that this arrangement was itself irregular: "the solicitation to investigate, transmitted to the head of Internal Audit of Deutsche Bank, came precisely from the department responsible for the accounting of financial products, that is, precisely from the division that should have been subject to the audit and that, on the contrary, directed the outcome of the same investigation of the Audit." According to the Financial Times, Deutsche Bank did not disclose in the audit that Sewing had previously approved a similar enhanced repo transaction with UniCredit in 2010 in his then role as chief credit officer — one of the deals examined by the same audit. The Group Audit Report, issued in April 2014, concluded that the deal team had made an "insufficient and selective" presentation to the GMRAC; that bond sourcing had been concealed from Finance, resulting in incorrect accounting; that the counterparties had intended to achieve an accounting objective; and that Deutsche Bank's proprietary indices had been manipulated to benefit the client. The Milan Court of Appeal later found that the audit report was "opaque" and the product of a "piloted internal investigation"; that "the Group Audit forced the conclusions on the role assumed by Abax [the bond intermediary] to justify the reclassification of the product into a derivative"; that passages in early draft versions of the report acknowledging that bond sourcing was common practice across Deutsche Bank's enhanced repo portfolio had been "marginalised in the final audit report"; and that the audit "had certainly influenced the PSP BaFin report and the same investigation launched by the Milan Prosecutor's Office."

=== BaFin special audit ===
A BaFin-commissioned special audit, conducted by Munich-based firm PSP and concluded in late 2014, found that Deutsche Bank had provided regulators with "several false statements" between April 2012 and August 2013, and that no internal investigation of the Santorini deal had been undertaken during that period despite regulatory pressure. The report attributed shared responsibility to Deutsche Bank's legal department, Finance department, and Internal Audit department, and found that a desire to clarify the matter "was not discernible for long stretches" — a finding that "also applies to Internal Audit." Despite this finding, BaFin approved Sewing's appointment to Deutsche Bank's Management Board in January 2015.

=== Transmission to Italian prosecutors ===
In May 2014, Deutsche Bank requested an unsolicited meeting with the Banca d'Italia, presenting the Group Audit findings and announcing disciplinary proceedings against deal team members. The Bank of Italy exercised no regulatory oversight over Deutsche Bank AG London, the entity that executed the transactions. Under Italian law, the Bank of Italy was legally required to transmit potential crimes to prosecutors. The Bank of Italy formally did so in November 2014. Italian prosecutors subsequently confirmed that Deutsche Bank's restatement and the Group Audit Report had "transformed the investigation." Before the audit findings were transmitted, years of investigation and many hours of witness testimony had produced no criminal suspects from Deutsche Bank.

== Italian criminal proceedings ==
=== Convictions (2019) ===
On 8 November 2019, the Milan Court of First Instance convicted six former Deutsche Bank employees — Michele Faissola, Dario Schiraldi, Michele Foresti, Ivor Dunbar, Marco Veroni and Matteo Vaghi — of abetting false accounting and market manipulation in connection with the Santorini transactions. Sentences ranged from 3.5 to 4.5 years' imprisonment. Italy's markets regulator, Consob, separately banned each convicted individual from holding any role in a regulated entity, effectively ending their careers in finance. None of the defendants served jail time pending appeal. The Court of First Instance found the testimony of Deutsche Bank's Deputy Head of Group Audit — who had presented the Group Audit Summary to the Bank of Italy in May 2014 and appeared as a prosecution witness in April 2018 at the time of Christian Sewing's promotion to Chief Executive Officer — to be pivotal to the convictions. The Milan Court of Appeal later found that the first instance judgment had "acknowledged only the conclusions of the consultants of the Public Prosecutor... conclusions that were taken from the results of the Deutsche Bank Audit, the real reasons for which were finally revealed by the documents subsequently delivered to the defendants."

=== Deutsche Bank's change of position ===
In January 2017, while the Italian criminal proceedings were ongoing, Deutsche Bank's lawyers filed a submission in a parallel civil case before the Tribunal of Florence, brought by the Fondazione Monte dei Paschi di Siena against Deutsche Bank. In that submission, Freshfields, acting for Deutsche Bank, formally stated that the Group Audit Report "does not in any way represent the bank's opinion on the matter, but simply that of the drafting office," and that its "methodologies and conclusions were criticised and largely disregarded." This position was not communicated to the Milan criminal court or the Italian defendants. Following a forensic analysis commissioned by one of the convicted bankers from Grant Thornton, Deutsche Bank in late 2021 provided defendants' lawyers with access to approximately 28,000 documents from a database of over 3.5 million it held relating to Santorini. In December 2021, Deutsche Bank filed a letter with the Milan Court of Appeal, signed by the new Global Head of Group Audit and new Head of Group Finance, reversing every position it had maintained since 2013. The letter, filed through its lawyers Freshfields, stated that the restatement had been unnecessary and deviated from general market practice; that bond sourcing was used throughout the industry and had been known to Finance throughout; that no evidence existed that the deal team deliberately concealed information; and that the accusation of concealment was "not supported by the facts and indeed contradicted by the evidence." In February 2022, Freshfields made oral submissions to the appeal court stating that "it took years, changes in the political climate within the bank before Deutsche Bank was willing to review its conclusions" and that the Group Audit Report had "arisen in a rather peculiar political situation within the bank."

=== Acquittals (2022–2023) ===
On 6 May 2022, the Milan Court of Appeal acquitted all six former Deutsche Bank employees completely, recording il fatto non sussiste — the facts alleged by the prosecutors simply did not occur. The court found that Santorini was not an anomalous or unlawful transaction; that bond sourcing was "perfectly known" to Deutsche Bank's Finance division throughout; that the real reasons for the 2013 restatement related to Deutsche Bank's need to manage regulatory pressure from the Fed rather than any concealment by the deal team; that the audit was "flawed, opaque and the product of a piloted investigation"; and that "the very division that should have been subjected to the audit instead directed its outcome." On 11 October 2023, the Italian Supreme Court confirmed the acquittals in full, stating that Deutsche Bank's change of position in 2013 "had to be seen in Deutsche Bank's need to circumvent possible balance sheet repercussions arising from the interpretative issues raised by the Fed" and "in no way demonstrated that accounting standards, as early as 2008, necessarily required transactions to be accounted for in closed balances."

== Civil proceedings ==
=== Frankfurt — Schiraldi v Deutsche Bank ===
In April 2024, former Deutsche Bank executive Dario Schiraldi filed a civil claim at the Landgericht Frankfurt (case 2-19 O 153/24) seeking €152 million in damages. The claim alleges that Deutsche Bank's Group Audit investigation and its proactive transmission to Italian regulators caused Schiraldi's wrongful prosecution, conviction and at least a decade of professional harm. Deutsche Bank disclosed the lawsuit in its 2024 Annual Report as a potentially significant civil litigation matter. A civil trial is scheduled for September 2026, following three postponements.

=== London — Faissola and others v Deutsche Bank ===
In October 2025, Quinn Emanuel Urquhart & Sullivan filed a claim in the High Court of Justice in London (case CL-2025-000448) on behalf of four former Deutsche Bank employees: Michele Faissola (formerly head of asset and wealth management and a member of Deutsche Bank's executive committee), Ivor Scott Dunbar (former co-head of global capital markets), Matteo Vaghi and Marco Veroni. The claim seeks in excess of £700 million in damages. The claim alleges unlawful means conspiracy, contending that from at least the second half of 2013, Deutsche Bank conspired to construct a false narrative attributing the restatement to newly discovered bond sourcing in order to shield senior executives from regulatory scrutiny, causing the wrongful prosecution of the deal team. The writ of summons, seen by the press, further alleges that Deutsche Bank set up a scheme involving documents not handed over to the supervisory authorities including the Fed, BaFin and the Bank of Italy, and to the Milan prosecutors.

=== Settlement ===
In February 2026, Deutsche Bank reached a confidential settlement with Michele Foresti on undisclosed terms — the first of the civil cases to be resolved.

== Deutsche Bank's position ==
Deutsche Bank has denied all allegations throughout the proceedings. The bank stated that its audit was conducted "thoroughly, properly and independently," that executives involved "discharged their responsibilities appropriately," and that it considers all civil claims to be "entirely without merit." Deutsche Bank stated it "stands by the core findings" of the internal investigation while also stating that it "fully supports" the Italian appeal court's acquittals, and disputes some of the court's "secondary conclusions" as presenting unproven allegations as facts. Reuters reported that Deutsche Bank's own internal review of the case, conducted in response to the litigation, found no wrongdoing.

== See also ==
- Deutsche Bank
- Banca Monte dei Paschi di Siena
- Christian Sewing
- Stephan Leithner
- Monte dei Paschi di Siena scandal
