= Joachim Faber =

German lawyer and business executive

- Born: May 10, 1950 (age 76); Gießen, Hesse, Germany
- Education: University of Bonn; German University of Administrative Sciences
- Occupations: lawyer, businessman

Joachim Faber (born 10 May 1950 in Gießen) is a German lawyer and business executive.

== Education ==
Educated at the University of Bonn, Faber earned his doctorate at the German University of Administrative Sciences in 1977.

== Career ==
Faber worked for 14 years in various positions for Citicorp in Frankfurt and London. He then joined Allianz in 1997, serving as the founding CEO of Allianz Global Investors for 12 years from 2000, during which period he built it into one of the world’s biggest asset managers, with around 1.5 trillion euros ($2 trillion) under management, by the time he retired in December 2011. During his time at the helm, he guided the unit through a number of major acquisitions, including PIMCO, which managed the world’s biggest bond fund at the time.

Faber has been serving as Chairman of the Supervisory Board of German Stock Exchange Group since May 2012, succeeding Manfred Gentz. By 2017, he was criticized by investors for the failed 2016 merger with the London Stock Exchange and a compensation program awarded to Carsten Kengeter who resigned as chief executive in October 2017. Under his leadership, the supervisory board introduced a cap on the annual pay packages of its board members at 9.5 million euros ($11.3 million) each. In 2019, he announced his intention to resign by 2020.

In Munich, Faber shares an office with Ann-Kristin Achleitner, Paul Achleitner, Michael Diekmann and Peter Löscher at Palais Preysing. He is an active investor in start up companies as well as an advisor for innovation initiative. (He sponsored the Chair for Business and Technology at ESMT, Berlin.)

== Other activities ==
=== Corporate boards ===
- HQ Capital, Member of the Supervisory Board (since 2019)
- Investcorp, Member of the Board of Directors (since 2019)
- HSBC Holdings Ltd., Non-Executive Director (since 2012), Chairman of the Risk Committee (since 2013)
- JAB Holding Company, Chairman of the Shareholder Committee
- Coty, Member of the Board of Directors (2010–2020)
- Osram, Member of the Supervisory Board (2013-2014)
- Infineon, Member of the Supervisory Board (2000-2005)

=== Non-profit organizations ===
- Wittelsbacher Ausgleichsfonds (WAF), Member of the Supervisory Board
- German Cancer Aid, Member of the Board (since 2055) and Chairman (2018-2024)
- European School of Management and Technology (ESMT), Member of the Supervisory Board
- German Council for Sustainable Development (RNE), former Member (appointed ad personam by the Chancellor)
- German Corp. Goverance Codex Commission, former Member
