= Joe Kaeser =

German businessman

Joe Kaeser GCME
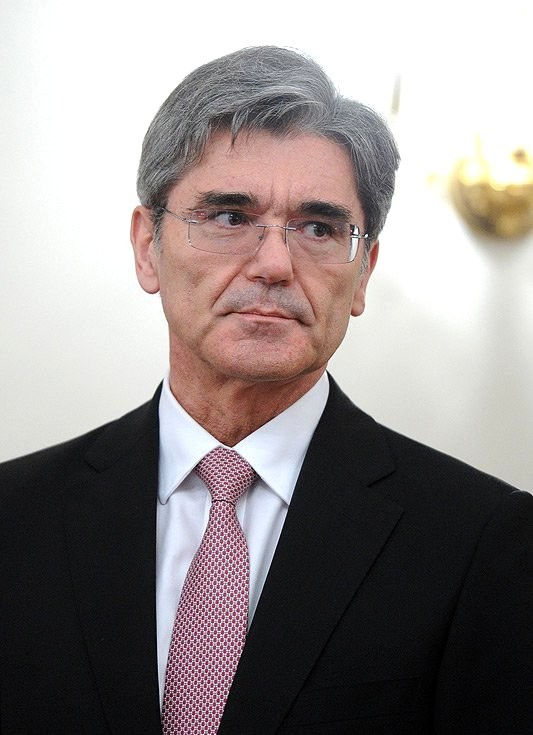
- Kaeser in 2014
- Born: Josef Käser; 23 June 1957 (age 69)
- Occupation: Manager
- Known for: Former CEO of Siemens AG

Joe Kaeser GCME (born Josef Käser; 23 June 1957) is a German manager who was CEO of Siemens AG from 2013 to 2021.

== Early life ==
Kaeser was born in Arnbruck, in the Bavarian Forest in West Germany, on June 23, 1957. He spent his early life in education throughout Germany. Following his studies in business administration at the Regensburg University of Applied Sciences, he joined Siemens in 1980.

== Career ==
=== Career at Siemens ===
Kaeser previously held various business administration management positions, including a term at the Siemens Components Operations in Malacca, Malaysia (1987–1988). In 1990 he was appointed vice president of business administration of the Opto Semiconductors Division. In 1994 Kaeser first was executive vice president and chief financial officer, and later CEO of the group's American subsidiary Siemens Components, located in Cupertino, California, as well as at Siemens Microelectronics, in neighboring San Jose.

In 1999 Kaeser joined Corporate Finance where he was responsible for developing a company-wide performance controlling system. During this time he also shared oversight for preparing the company's stock market listing in New York and the worldwide conversion of its accounting system to US GAAP.

From April 2001 to September 2004, Kaeser was a member of the group executive committee of IC Mobile and was its chief financial officer, where he was especially active in managing and restructuring its finance exposure from customer loans and working capital management.

In his former function as chief strategy officer, Kaeser supported CEO Dr. Klaus Kleinfeld in the design and execution of the Fit4More transformation program, as well as the long-term orientation of the company's strategies on global megatrends.

=== CEO of Siemens, 2013–2021 ===
In July 2013 it was announced that Kaeser would replace Peter Löscher as the CEO of the Siemens AG.

Since 2013, Kaeser has accompanied Chancellor Angela Merkel on nine state visits abroad, including to China (2014, 2016, 2018) India (2015), Egypt (2017), Tunisia (2017), Argentina (2017), Mexico (2017) and Saudi Arabia (2017). He also travelled with Vice Chancellor Sigmar Gabriel to the US and Mexico in 2017.

During the Hannover Messe in April 2016, Kaeser was among the 15 German CEOs who were invited to a private dinner with US President Barack Obama. He was also part of Merkel's delegation on the occasion of her first visit to US President Donald Trump in March 2017. At the 2018 World Economic Forum in Davos, he attended a dinner for Trump with a group of European CEOs.

In January 2020 Kaeser along with the Siemens board of directors invited an environmental activist a role on its board as it made a decision with mining giant Adani.

== Russian visit during the 2014 annexation of Crimea ==
Kaeser travelled to Russia to meet with Russian President Vladimir Putin in April 2014 to re-affirm Siemens' commitment to Russian profits despite widespread international condemnation of Russian military intervention. The move was widely criticized in the Western World, including by German Chancellor Angela Merkel. However Kaeser wasn't the only one who had a more pro-Russian mood at that time; many other prominent Germans like former chancellors Helmut Schmidt and Gehard Schroeder voiced their concern for more understanding of Russia's views, including some in Merkel's own party, like Peter Gauweiler or Armin Laschet, who all faced criticism in the German Press. Later, former US Adviser Zbigniew Brzezinski revealed that the former World Bank Chief Robert Zoellick aggressively pressured Kaeser due to his Russian visit. Zoellick reminded Kaeser that his company has more business in the United States than in Russia, and it would have negative consequences if he kept following the Russian path.

== Later career ==
In 2023, EIG Global Energy Partners appointed Kaeser as Senior Advisor.

== Other activities ==
=== Corporate boards ===
- Linde plc, Member of the board of directors (since 2021)
- Daimler Truck, Chair of the supervisory board (since 2021)
- Siemens Energy AG, Chair of the supervisory board (since 2020)
- Allianz Deutschland AG, Member of the supervisory board
- JPMorgan Chase, Member of the International Council (since 2015)
- NXP Semiconductors, Member of the board of directors (2010–2022)
- Daimler AG, Member of the supervisory board (2014–2021)

=== Non-profit organizations ===
- Munich Security Conference, Chair of the Advisory Council (since 2023)
- Asia-Pacific Committee of German Business (APA), Chairman (since 2019)
- Federation of German Industries (BDI), Member of the Presidium (2017–2019)
- European Round Table of Industrialists (ERT), Member
- Baden-Badener Unternehmer-Gespräche (BBUG), Member of the board of trustees
- Deutscher Zukunftspreis, Member of the board of trustees
- European School of Management and Technology (ESMT), Member of the board of trustees
- Goethe Institute, Member of the Business and Industry Advisory Board
- Technical University of Munich (TUM), Member of the board of trustees
- Trilateral Commission, Member of the European Group
- Stifterverband für die Deutsche Wissenschaft, Member of the Board
- World Economic Forum Member of Board of Trustees

== Honours ==
- Grand Cross of the Order of Entrepreneurial Merit (Industrial Class), Portugal (13 May 2015)
- 2017 – Prize for Understanding and Tolerance, awarded by the Jewish Museum Berlin

Preceded by Peter Löscher	CEO of Siemens; 2013 – 2021	Succeeded by Roland Busch
