= Peter Löscher =

Austrian manager (born 1957)

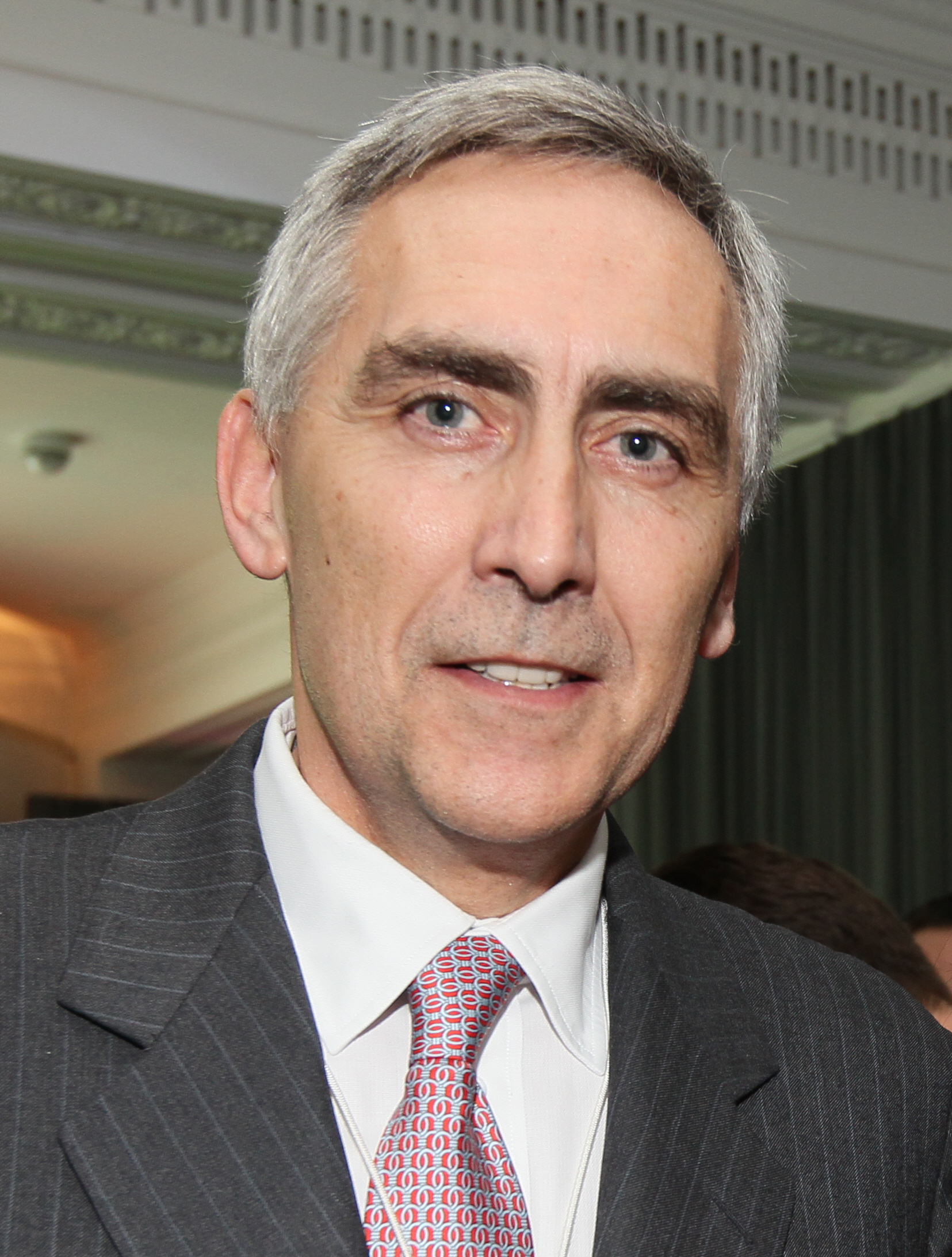
- Peter Löscher at the Financial Times CNBC Davos Nightcap, 26 January 2012

Peter Löscher (born 17 September 1957 in Villach, Austria) is an Austrian manager who was the CEO of Siemens from 2007 until 2013. As of 2017, Löscher remains as the only CEO to be hired from outside the conglomerate in the 170-year history of Siemens. Before joining Siemens, he worked as president for Global Human Health at global pharmaceutical company Merck & Co.

== Early life and education ==
Löscher graduated from Gymnasium Villach/Austria in 1978 and got a master's degree at the Vienna University of Economics and Business Administration. Later he attended but did not obtain a degree from an MBA program at the Chinese University of Hong Kong, and attended the six-week Advanced Management Program (AMP) at Harvard Business School. In 2007 he received the honorary degree of Doctor of Engineering from Michigan State University.

== Career ==
=== Early career ===
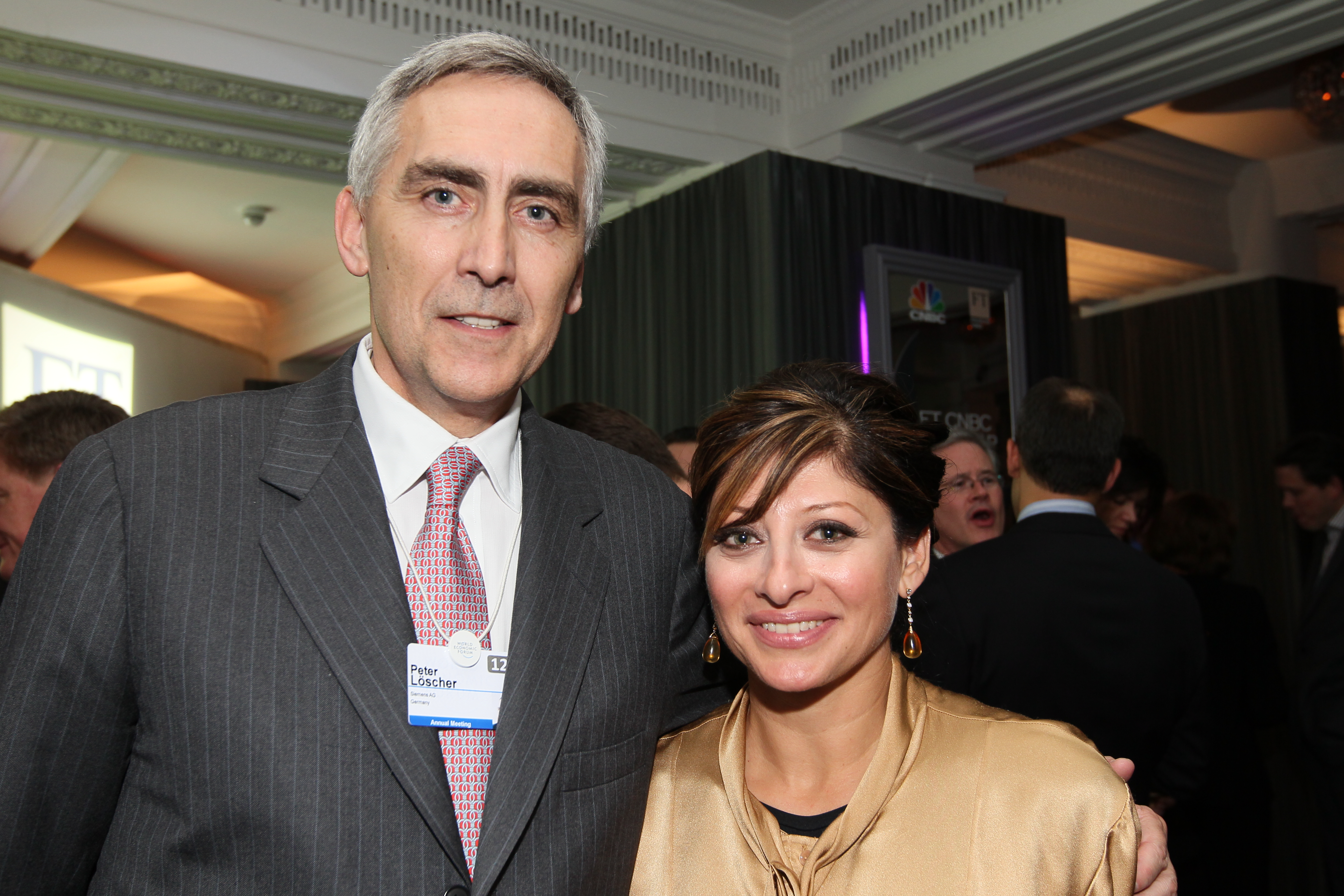
Peter Löscher, President and CEO of Siemens, with Maria Bartiromo, the television journalist, at the FT CNBC Davos Nightcap, 26th January 2012

From 1988 until 2000 he worked for the German pharmaceutical company Hoechst in Spain, Japan, Great Britain and the United States. After Hoechst merged with Rhone-Poulenc he stayed at Aventis until 2002. He then joined Amersham, which was taken over by General Electric. In 2006 he became a member of the executive board of the US pharmaceutical company Merck.

=== Siemens ===
In 2007 Löscher became the first CEO of Siemens AG to be appointed from outside the company. He was appointed on 20 May 2007 as the successor of Klaus Kleinfeld, and was selected to take on the new position on 1 July 2007. Under Löscher, Siemens spun off its Osram lighting unit and sold its half of a joint venture with Nokia that supplied equipment for mobile telecommunication networks. In 2012, he earned 8.7 million euros. In late 2012, he initiated efforts to save 6 billion euros ($7.7 billion) over the following two years.

In his capacity as CEO, Löscher accompanied Chancellor Angela Merkel on various state visits, including to China in 2012.

Following a series of missteps under his leadership, including a late delivery of high-speed ICE trains for German national railroad Deutsche Bahn and delays in completing offshore wind turbine projects, he was replaced by Joe Kaeser (Josef Käser) as CEO and left Siemens in July 2013, four years before the end of his contract.

=== Later career ===
Under the terms of his pay-off of 17 million euros from Siemens, Löscher was obliged not to work for a "significant competitor" of the company until September 2015.

In 2014, Löscher was hired by Russian billionaire Viktor Vekselberg to serve as chief executive of Renova Management (RMAG), which oversees his international industrial holdings, including stakes in Sulzer and in Oerlikon. He left Renova in 2016, amid disagreements with Vekselberg.

Also in 2014, Russian Railways (RZD) nominated Löscher as member of the company’s board of directors; however, he ultimately wasn’t considered.

In Munich, Löscher shares an office with Ann-Kristin Achleitner, Paul Achleitner, Michael Diekmann and Joachim Faber.

== Other activities ==
=== Corporate boards ===
- CaixaBank, Member of the Board of Directors (since 2023)
- Salesforce, Member of the Advisory Board on Europe, the Middle East and Africa (since 2020)
- Philips, Member of the Supervisory Board (since 2020)
- Telefónica Germany, Member of the Supervisory Board (since 2020)
- Doha Venture Capital, Non-Executive Member of the Board of Directors
- Telefónica, Independent Member of the Board of Directors (since 2016)
- TBG AG, Member of the Board of Directors (since 2013)
- Sulzer, Chairman of the Board of Directors (2014–2022)
- OMV, Chair of the Supervisory Board (2016-2019)
- Deutsche Bank, Member of the European Advisory Board (2011), Member of the Supervisory Board (2012-2017)
- Munich Re, Member of the Supevisory Board (2009-2014)
- Smiths Group (2007–2008)

=== Non-profit organizations ===
- Bocconi University, Member of the International Advisory Council
- Asia-Pacific Committee of German Business (APA), Chairman (2010-2014)
- Siemens Stiftung, Chairman of the Board of Trustees (2008-2014)

== Personal life ==
Löscher speaks German, English, French, Spanish, and Japanese. He and his Spanish-born wife have three children. According to an interview in The New York Times, Löscher was the captain of the volleyball team at high school and college.

Preceded by Klaus Kleinfeld	CEO of Siemens; 2007 – 31 July 2013	Succeeded by Joe Kaeser
