= Deutsche Börse Cloud Exchange AG =

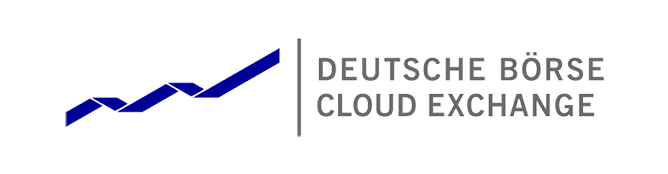
- Company type: Public Aktiengesellschaft
- Industry: Cloud Computing
- Founded: 2013
- Defunct: 2016
- Fate: Closed down by owners
- Headquarters: Eschborn, Germany
- Key people: Randolf Roth (CEO), Maximilian Ahrens (CTO))
- Services: Marketplace for IaaS cloud resources
- Number of employees: 49 (2016)
- Website: cloud.exchange

The Deutsche Börse Cloud Exchange AG (DBCE) was a German company that operated an international marketplace for buying and selling of cloud computing resources. Users of the marketplace could either cover their additional storage and computing requirements or offer infrastructure as a service (IaaS) capacities.

The company was a joint venture, established in May 2013, between Deutsche Börse AG and Zimory GmbH. In February 2016 DBCE publicly announced discontinuing their operations.

== History ==
In 2013, the DBCE was established as a joint venture between Deutsche Börse AG and Zimory GmbH. The beginning of 2014 marked the beta launch of the cloud marketplace, in which various providers already linked their services with the marketplace. The official launch of the marketplace was on May 20, 2015. To start off, five providers from various European countries offered their IaaS resources via the DBCE.

In February 2016 DBCE publicly announced discontinuing their operations publishing the following message in March 2016 on the website www.cloud.exchange:

Deutsche Börse Cloud Exchange discontinues operations

Dear visitor,

The shareholders of the Deutsche Börse Cloud Exchange decided to cease operations of the marketplace while evaluating the business model and approach. The company ended registration for new users of the marketplace on January 18. Existing contracts will be fulfilled until they expire in accordance with the individual agreements. The public marketplace was scheduled to be retired in March 2016.

We thank you for your interest, cooperation and support. Please contact us directly in case of further questions.

The DBCE team

== Marketplace ==
The vendor-agnostic IaaS marketplace of the DBCE functions as a neutral intermediary between cloud providers and cloud users. In the marketplace, providers offer IT infrastructure resources such as CPU, storage and RAM as a service. On the other side, buyers have the opportunity to search for, buy and subsequently use appropriate IaaS offers from providers.

The access to the marketplace is reserved only to companies and is not open to private individuals. The marketplace allowed users to compare IaaS resources, purchased, used and paid for on a standardized basis. This made individual offers of providers directly comparable, creating transparency for the buyer.

== Technology ==
The DBCE make available vendor-agnostic cloud resources procured via the marketplace. It did this by means of the system behind the trading platform. It offered a central interface (API) for all standard cloud technologies and enabled the provision of the purchased resources independent of the technologies being used by the customers. It therefore enabled companies to liberate themselves from proprietary systems.

== Security ==
In order to guarantee the quality and security of the services, DBCE, in cooperation with TÜV Rheinland developed a special testing procedure for providers as a prerequisite for access to the marketplace. For existing suppliers in the marketplace, an annual review of various parameters was conducted, including performance of the services offered, as well as modifications at the storage location of the servers.

== Standards ==
The marketplace was based, above all, on a consistent standardization concept. In addition to a standardized search and buy procedure, the agreements between buyers and DBCE were standardized as well. This was intended to accelerate the normally drawn-out contract negotiations between providers and users in the cloud sector. What's more, the DBCE acted as a controlling entity and thus ensured that certain security and compliance procedures would always be upheld.

The services traded via the marketplace were also standardized in order to enable a comparison of the individual provider offers. Storage was available in blocks of 100 gigabytes of memory, and for compute resources, the DBCE introduced the performance unit (PU). This is where the DBCE differentiated itself from other cloud providers. Because different CPU offers were normally difficult to compare, the DBCE specifies the PU as a defined standard for all CPU offers in the marketplace. Which meant it does not matter from which provider the buyer is procuring CPU resources via the marketplace: The PU always delivers comparable performance, independent of the underlying hardware.

== See also ==
- Cloud Computing
- Iaas
