= Paul Achleitner =

Austrian businessperson

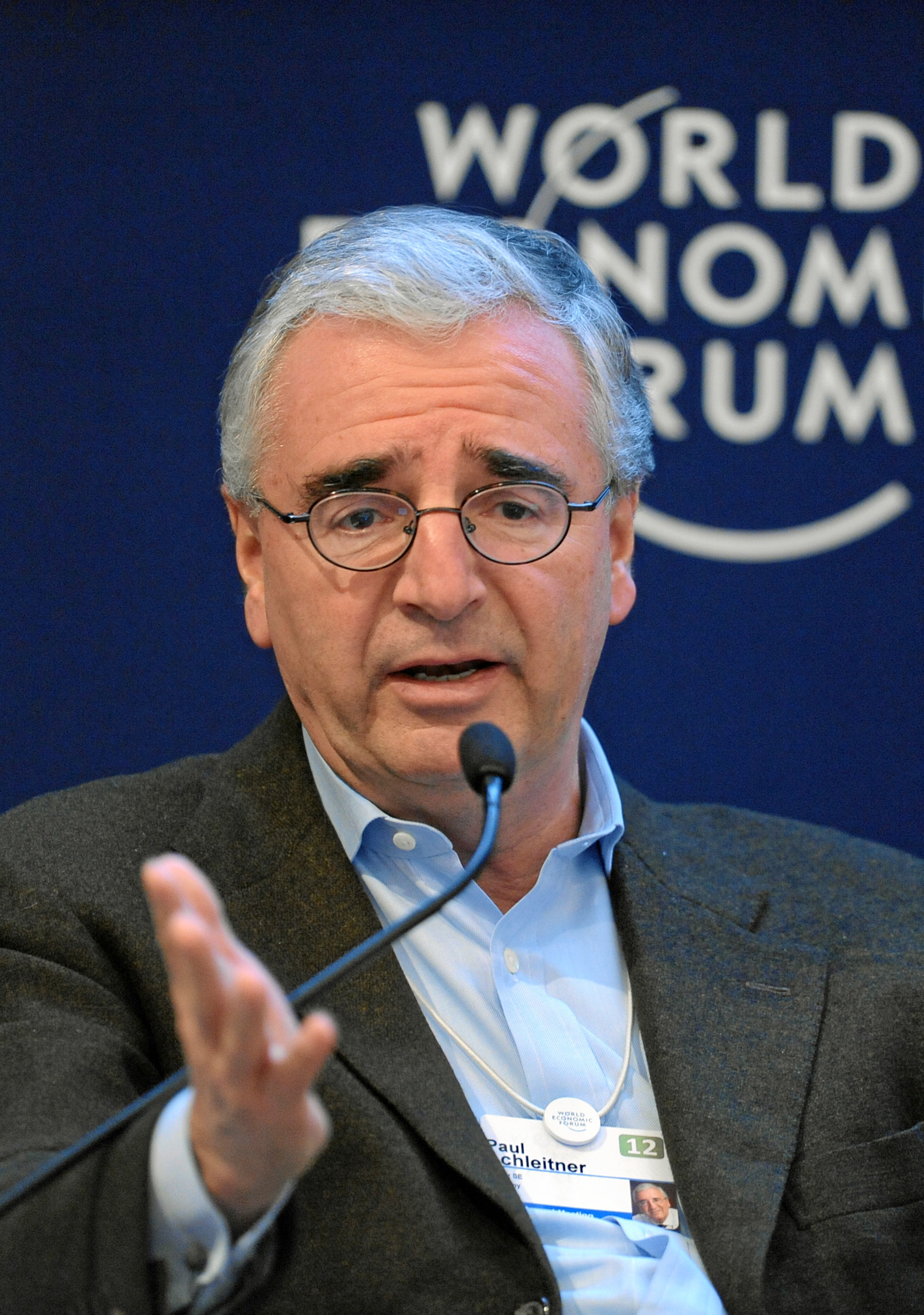
- Achleitner in 2013
- Born: 28 September 1956
- Education: University of St. Gallen, Harvard Business School
- Occupation: Social scientist, jurist
- Awards: Cicero Orator Prize (2002)

Paul M. Achleitner (born 28 September 1956 in Linz) is an Austrian businessman who served as chairman of the supervisory board of Deutsche Bank from 2012 to 2022.

== Education ==
Achleitner studied Business Administration, Economics, Law and Social Sciences at the University of St. Gallen, where he also earned his doctorate. He was also a visiting fellowship at Harvard Business School from 1982 to 1984.

== Career ==
=== Early career ===
Achleitner worked for Bain and Company and as the managing director of the German subsidiary of Goldman Sachs. In 2000, Achleitner joined Allianz AG as chief financial officer, where he was primarily responsible for finance and investments. He left Allianz in 2012.

=== Deutsche Bank, 2012–2022 ===
After his appointment to the chairman of the supervisory board of Deutsche Bank, he retained the support of the bank's biggest shareholder, Qatari Sheikh Hamad bin Jassim bin Jaber Al Thani, and, in 2017, shareholders backed Achleitner's re-election to a second five-year term. From 2018 until 2020, he faced for three years in a row a vote to remove him from his post. Through his time in office, he oversaw multiple CEO changes, including Anshu Jain (2012-2015), Jürgen Fitschen (2012-2016), John Cryan (2015-2018) and Christian Sewing (2018–2022).

According to various surveys, Achleitner was the highest paid supervisory board head at Germany's 30 biggest listed companies that make up the benchmark DAX index between 2016 and 2018. In August 2019, he bought nearly 1 million euros of the bank's shares. In Munich, he shares an office with his wife Ann-Kristin Achleitner, Michael Diekmann, Joachim Faber and Peter Löscher.

== Other activities ==
Achleitner is an honorary professor of the WHU - Otto Beisheim School of Management in Vallendar, Germany, where he teaches a course in investment banking. He is also head of the Exchange Expert Commission, and a member of the German federal commission for the German Corporate Governance Code.

=== Corporate boards ===
- Deutsche Bank, Chair of the Global Advisory Board (since 2022)
- Hakluyt & Company, Member of the International Advisory Board (since 2022)
- Bayer AG, Member of the Supervisory Board (2002–2026)
- Henkel AG & Sons, Member of the Shareholders' Committee (since 2001), Member of the Finance Subcommittee
- Daimler, Member of the Supervisory Board (2010-2020)
- RWE AG, Member of the Supervisory Board (2000-2013)

=== Non-profit organizations ===
- Alfred Herrhausen Gesellschaft of Deutsche Bank, Chairman of the Board of Trustees
- Bilderberg Group, Treasurer and Member of the Steering Committee
- Bocconi University, Member of the International Advisory Council
- European Financial Services Roundtable (EFR), Chairman
- Brookings Institution, Member of the Board of Trustees (since 2013)
- Munich Security Conference, Member of the Advisory Council

== Personal life ==
Achleitner is married to Ann-Kristin Achleitner, a professor of business at the Technical University of Munich.
