= Stephan Leithner =

Austrian business executive (born 1966)

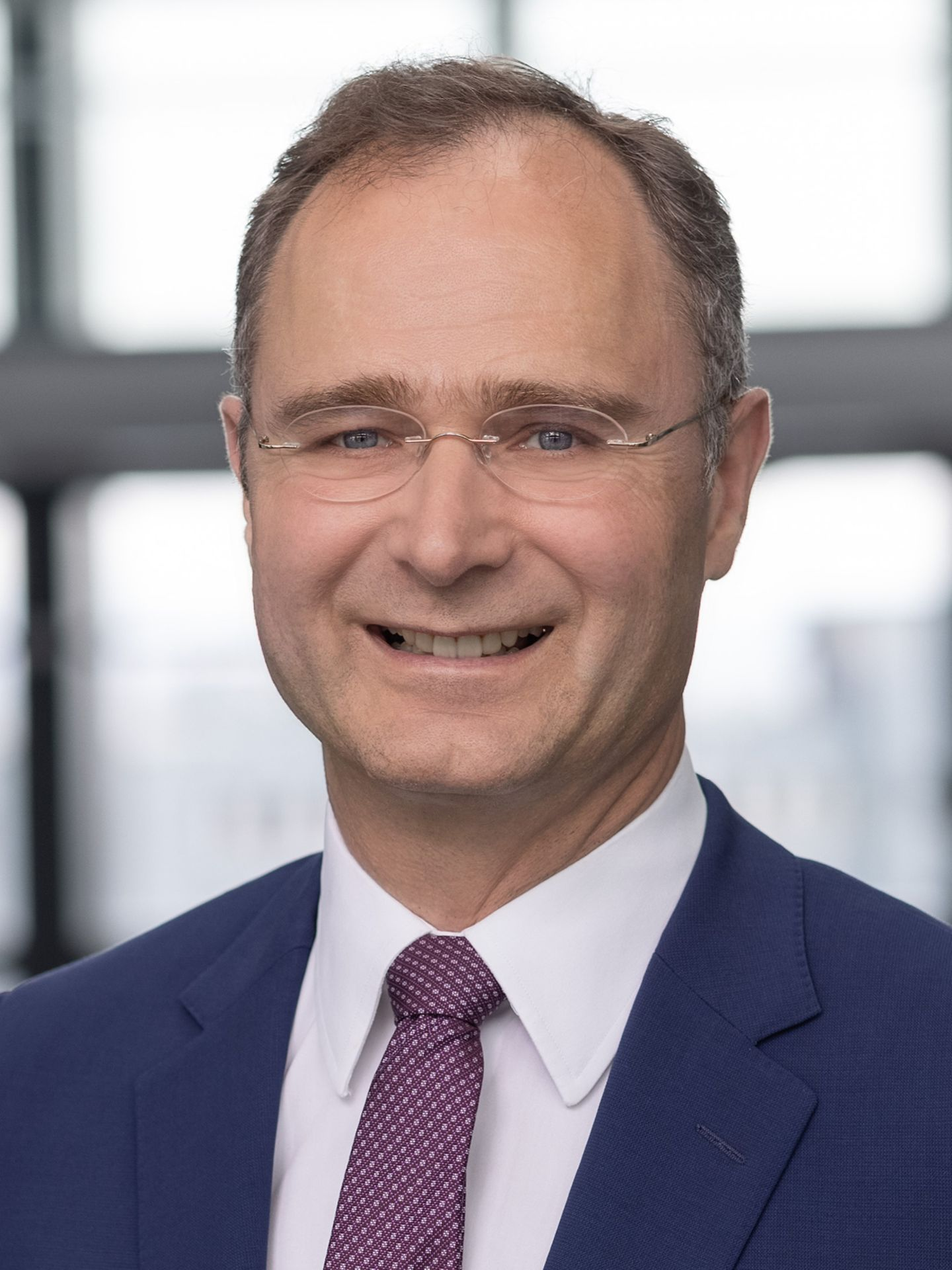
- Stephan Leithner in 2021
- Born: 1966 (age 59–60); Innsbruck, Austria
- Education: University of St. Gallen (Ph.D.)
- Occupation: Banker
- Known for: CEO of German stock exchange, the Deutsche Börse AG
- Children: 3

Stephan Leithner (born 15 May 1966 in Innsbruck) is an Austrian business executive. He became a member of the Executive Board of Deutsche Börse AG in 2018 and its CEO on 1 January 2025.

== Early life and education ==
Stephan Leithner studied at the University of St. Gallen (Switzerland) from 1985 to 1989 and received his Ph.D. in Finance in 1992.

== Career ==
He began his professional career as a research assistant at the Swiss Institute of Banking and Finance in St. Gallen (Switzerland). In 1992, Stephan Leithner joined the management consulting firm McKinsey & Company and worked in Frankfurt (Germany), New York (USA) and Munich (Germany), becoming a partner in 1997. From 2000 to 2015, he worked for Deutsche Bank AG. In addition to management positions in Global Banking, he was Global Head Corporate Finance from 2010 to 2012 and was appointed to the Management Board of Deutsche Bank AG in 2012. In 2016, he moved to Munich (Germany) to join the Swedish financial investor EQT Partners GmbH as a Partner (Private Equity).

Since 2018, Leithner has been a member of the Executive Board of Deutsche Börse AG, where he was responsible for Pre- and Post-Trading until June 2024. In March 2024, he was appointed Deputy CEO. From June until the end of 2024, he headed the Investment Management Solutions segment. In October 2024, Stephan Leithner was appointed Co-CEO of Deutsche Börse AG and, together with his predecessor Theodor Weimer, led the company in this position until the end of 2024. Since 1 January 2025, Stephan Leithner is the CEO of Deutsche Börse AG.

Leithner is a member of the board of trustees of the Frankfurt School of Finance & Management gGmbH and the board of trustees of the Schirn Kunsthalle Frankfurt.

== Personal life ==
Stephan Leithner is married and has three children.
