= Peter Bogetoft =

Danish author, economist

Peter Bogetoft (born 1957) is a Danish author, economist and professor in the Department of Economics at Copenhagen Business School. He is recognized for his significant contributions to applied microeconomics and managerial economics.

== Early life and career ==
Bogetoft earned his doctoral degree, Dr. merc. (dr.hab.), from Copenhagen Business School in 1994. He holds a master's degree (MSc) in Mathematical Economics from the University of Aarhus. Bogetoft serves as a Full Professor (chair) in Applied Microeconomics at CBS since 2007. Prior to this, he held a position in Managerial Economics at the University of Copenhagen from 1995 to 2007. Bogetoft has supervised over 20 PhD theses on various subjects related to ethical accounting, productivity analysis, decision support systems, contracting theory, and industrial organization.

Bogetoft has held leadership positions, including Center Leader at the Foundation of Electronic Markets CFEM (2010–2016) and Head of Economic Section at the Royal Veterinary and Agricultural University (1996–1997). He has been involved in numerous research projects and has received grants from notable institutions such as the Rockwool Foundation, Independent Research Fund Denmark, Danish Industry Foundation etc.

== Recognition and awards ==
- Tietgen Gold Medal (1991)
- Best Teacher's Award at Copenhagen Business School (1993)
- FUHU Research Prize (2010)
- Knight of the Order of the Dannebrog (2023)

== Publications ==
- Planning with Multiple Objectives: Investigation, Communication and Choice, with P.Pruzan, pp. 1–367, North Holland, 1991.
- Non-Cooperative Planning Theory, pp. 1–314, Springer-Verlag, 1994.
- Parallelism in Information Production: Moral Hazard and Relative Performance Evaluation, Management Science, 39, pp. 448–457, 1993.
- Benchmarking with DEA, SFA and R, with Lars Otto, Springer, New York, pp. 1–351, 2011.
