= Werner Seifert =

Werner Seifert (born 4 July 1949) is a Swiss businessman and the former chief executive of the German Stock Exchange.

== Career ==
=== German Stock Exchange ===
He formed the Eurex Exchange in 1998; the UK equivalent is LIFFE (London International Financial Futures and Options Exchange). He formed the Xetra (trading system). He tried to merge the German Stock Exchange with the London Stock Exchange (LSE) in 2000, and to take it over in 2005.

== Personal life ==
He is a musician and plays the piano. He likes British sports cars.

== See also ==
- Clara Furse, chief executive of the London Stock Exchange from 2001–09

Business positions
Preceded by	Chief Executive of the German Stock Exchange; 1993 - 2005	Succeeded by
