= Carsten Kengeter =

Carsten Kengeter (born March 31, 1967) is the former CEO of Deutsche Börse. He was the chief executive officer and Head of the management board of Deutsche Börse AG from June 1, 2015, to Jan 1, 2018.

== Biography ==
=== Early life and education ===
Kengeter was born March 31, 1967, in Heilbronn, West Germany, the only child of Christel and Rainer Kengeter. He grew up in Neckarwestheim and completed his primary and secondary education in this region as well as his military service. His father died in the Interflug airplane accident at Leipzig airport in 1975 and his mother still lives near Heilbronn today.

He earned a BA in business administration from the Middlesex University, London, and a Diplom-Betriebswirt graduate degree in business administration from Reutlingen University. He completed his studies with a MSc in finance and accounting from the London School of Economics in 1992.

Carsten Kengeter is married and has three children. He completed the Patrouille des Glaciers race.

=== Career ===
Kengeter started his professional career in 1992 in the credit derivatives trading business at Barclays de Zoete Wedd in London. After five years there, he switched to derivatives marketing at Goldman Sachs in Frankfurt, where he soon rose to co-head European Fixed Income, Currencies and Commodities (FICC). He became a partner in 2002, and transferred to Hong Kong as co-head of the company's Asia (excluding Japan) securities division. During his four years working in Hong Kong he developed a passion for yoga and the Chinese breathing and meditation discipline neigong, for "inner strength".

He moved to UBS AG in 2008 as co-head of FICC. Credited with restructuring the Swiss bank's subprime mortgage portfolio, he joined the executive board and added the responsibility of co-chief executive of UBS Investment Bank alongside Alex Wilmot-Sitwell in 2009. Kengeter became sole chairman and CEO in 2010 after Wilmost-Sitwell moved to Hong Kong to bolster the bank's Asian-Pacific operations.

During Kengeter's tenure as chairman and CEO, UBS was investigated in connection with the fraudulent manipulation of Libor, a globally-used benchmark interest rate. UBS trader Tom Hayes would later testify that Kengeter participated in meetings in Tokyo where plans to manipulated Libor were discussed, but authorities never accused Kengeter of wrongdoing.

Kengeter's reputation was tarnished by the 2011 UBS rogue trader scandal, which lost the bank $2.3 billion and created pressure for Kengeter to resign. He gave up his 2011 bonus, and in November 2012, stepped down from the bank's executive board and was reassigned to oversee the winding down of non-core businesses. He resigned from UBS in February 2013.

He became a visiting professor in the Department of Finance at his alma mater, the London School of Economics.

In October 2017, it was announced Kengeter would be stepping down as CEO of Deutsche Börse. He has been CEO since June 2015 and member of the executive board since April 2015.

He is a board member of several international organisations such as the China Europe International Exchange AG and b-to-v Partners AG. Additionally he is chairman of the supervisory board of Circuitous Capital LLP, Director of FNZ Group Ltd. and member of the advisory board of the Financial Markets Group and the Systemic Risk Centre of the London School of Economics and Political Science, as well as a member of the Fixed Income Currencies Commodities Markets Standards Board.
