= SimCorp =

Danish company

SimCorp A/S

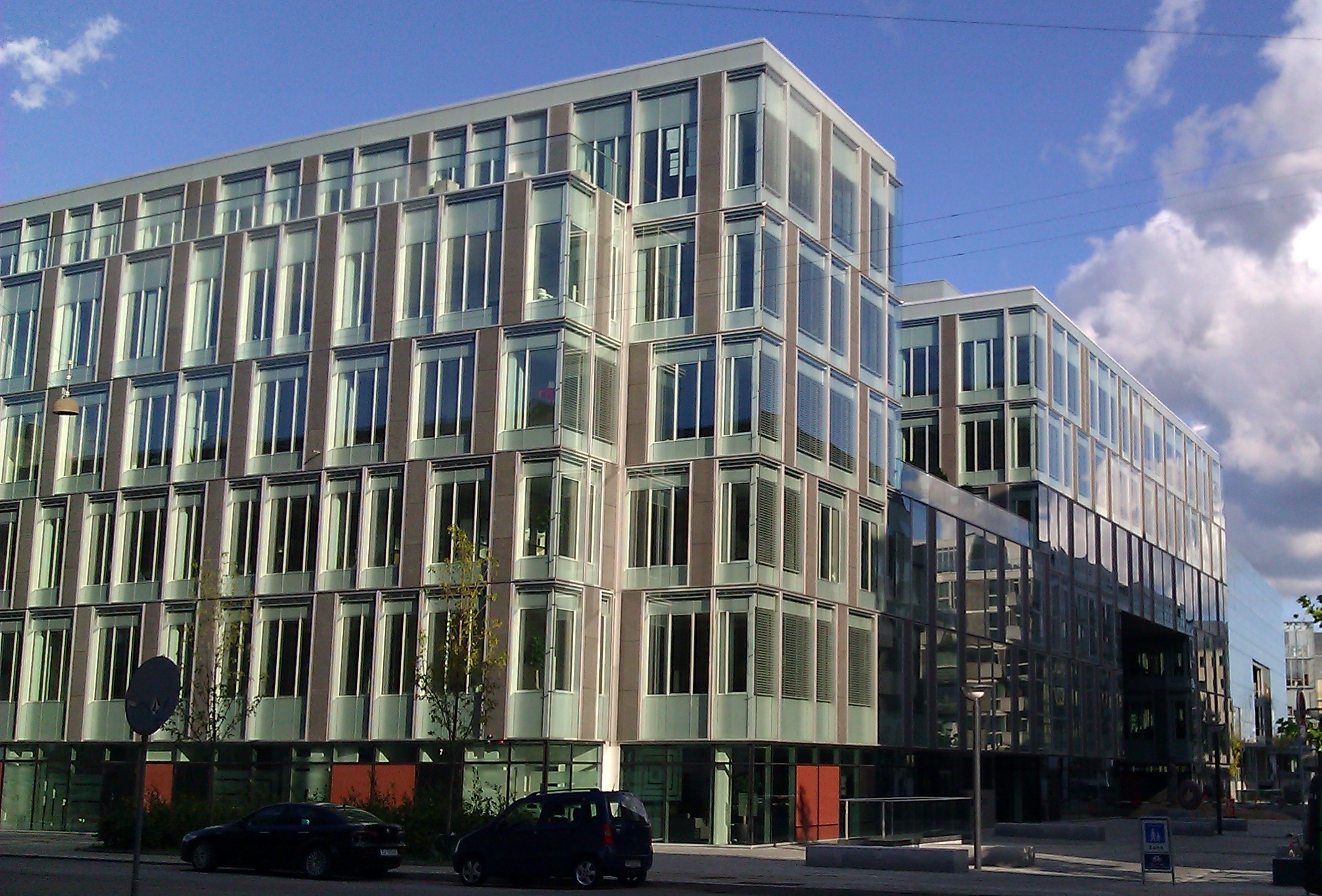
- Type: Subsidiary
- Industry: Financial software
- Founded: 1971; 55 years ago
- Headquarters: Copenhagen, Denmark
- Number of locations: 20
- Key people: Peter Sanderson (CEO); Christian Kromann (Chairman)
- Products: SimCorp Dimension, SimCorp Coric, SimCorp Gain, SimCorp Sofia, and SimCorp One
- Revenue: €382.6 million (2018)
- Operating income: €103 million (2018)
- Net income: €77 million (2018)
- Total equity: DKK 20.23 billion (2018)
- Number of employees: c. 3,100 (2024)
- Parent: Deutsche Börse Group
- Website: simcorp.com

SimCorp A/S is a global company providing software and services to financial institutions such as asset managers, banks, central banks, pension funds, sovereign wealth funds and insurance companies worldwide. Founded in 1971, it has over 3000 employees.

SimCorp is headquartered in Copenhagen and has offices in over 35 locations throughout Europe, Asia, and North America. Listed on the Nasdaq Copenhagen exchange until 2023, its core product is the SimCorp Dimension, a front to back integrated investment management system used by more than 190 clients around the world.

In 2023, stock exchange operator Deutsche Börse agreed to buy SimCorp for €3.9 billion. On November 9, Deutsche Börse announced that it had completed the purchase of the company.

== Acquisitions ==
Over the years, SimCorp has acquired several companies:

- Equipos, now SimCorp Coric, was acquired in 2014 and offers client reporting software.
- APL Italiana, now SimCorp Italiana, was acquired in 2017 and provides integrated investment management software for the Italian insurance market.
- AIM Software, now SimCorp Gain, was acquired in 2019 and focuses on enterprise data management software for the buy side.
- Axioma Inc., merged in 2023 and provides factor risk models, portfolio construction tools, and multi-asset class enterprise risk solutions.
