= Deutsche Börse =

Financial services company of Germany

Deutsche Börse AG

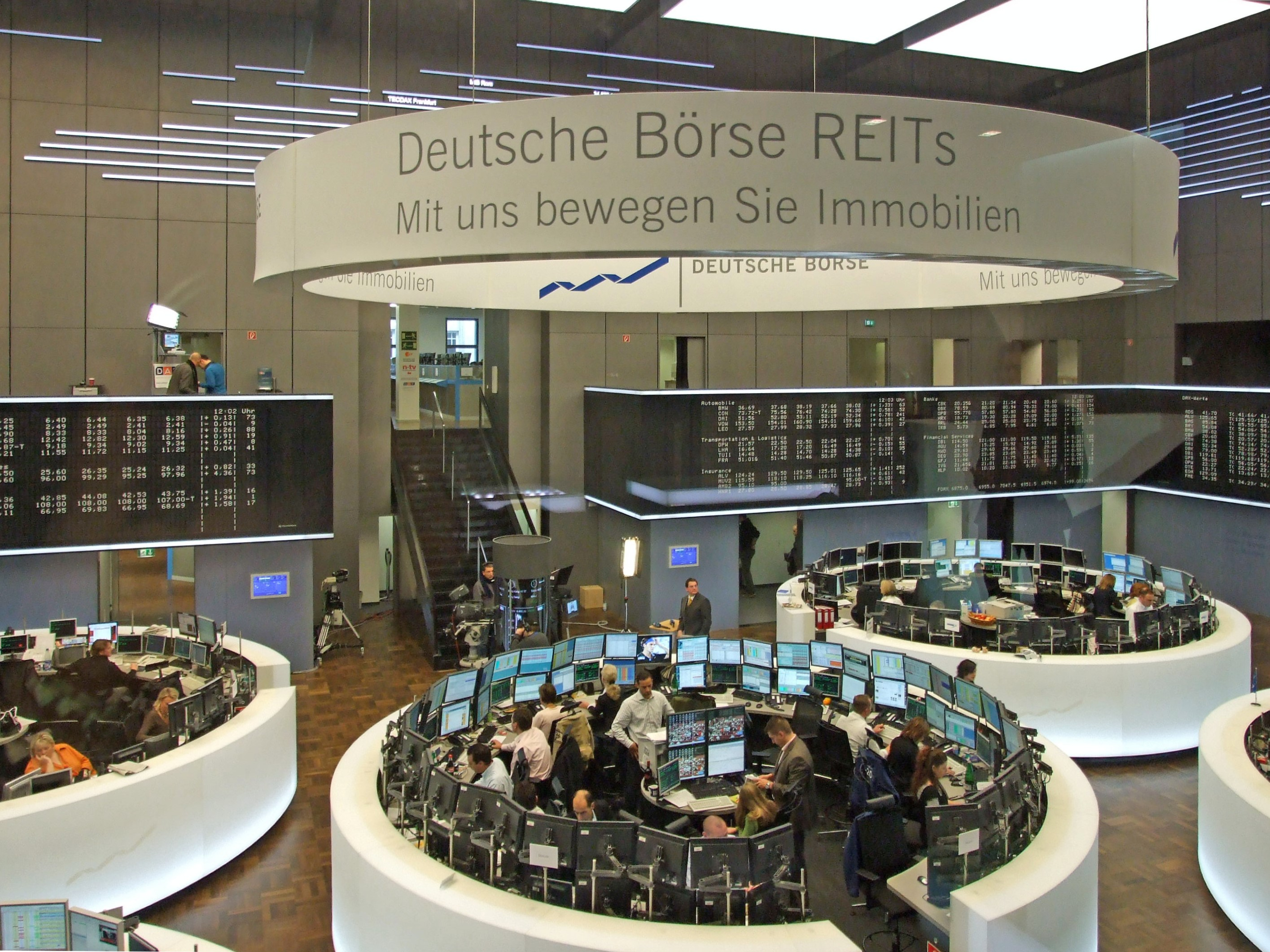
- Deutsche Börse trading floor in Frankfurt
- Type: Public (Aktiengesellschaft)
- Traded as: FWB: DB1; DAX component; EURO STOXX 50 component
- Industry: Finance
- Founded: 1992; 34 years ago
- Headquarters: Frankfurt am Main, Germany
- Key people: Stephan Leithner (CEO); Joachim Faber (chairman of the supervisory board)
- Services: Equity trading platforms, derivatives markets, clearing, market data
- Revenue: ▲€5.829 billion (2024)
- Operating income: ▲€2.9 billion (2024)
- Net income: ▲€1.949 billion (2024)
- Total assets: ▼€222.112 billion (2024)
- Total equity: ▲€11.259 billion (2024)
- Number of employees: 15,835 (FTE, mid 2025)
- Subsidiaries: 360T, Frankfurt Stock Exchange, Clearstream, Xetra, Eurex, STOXX, Qontigo, SimCorp
- Website: deutsche-boerse.com

Deutsche Börse AG (German pronunciation: [ˈdɔʏtʃə ˈbœʁzə]), or the Deutsche Börse Group, is a German multinational corporation that offers a marketplace for organizing the trading of shares and other securities. It is also a transaction services provider, giving companies and investors access to global capital markets. Founded in 1992, it is a joint stock company headquartered in Frankfurt. It is the third-largest stock market in Europe by market cap after Euronext Paris and the London Stock Exchange.

On 1 October 2014, Deutsche Börse AG became the 14th announced member of the United Nations Sustainable Stock Exchanges initiative. On 23 August 2023, the company formed EuroCTP as a joint venture with 13 other bourses, to provide a consolidated tape for the European Union, as part of the Capital Markets Union proposed by the European Commission.

== Company ==
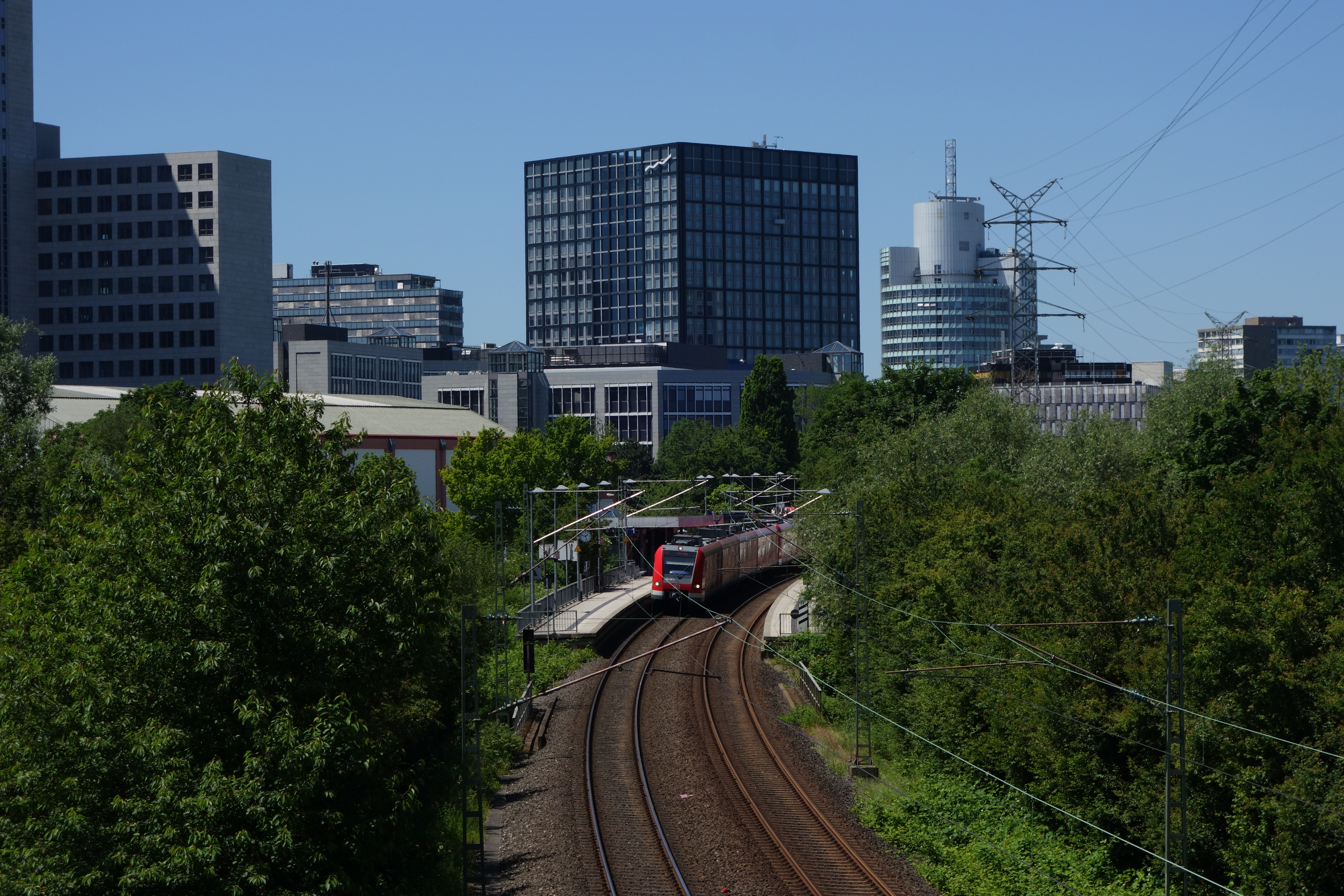
The new building of Deutsche Börse called The Cube in Eschborn above S-train station Eschborn Süd with DB class 423 as S 4, heading for Langen (above)

More than 3,200 employees service customers in Europe, the United States, and Asia. Deutsche Börse has locations in Germany, Luxembourg, Switzerland, Czech Republic, and Spain, as well as representative offices in Beijing, London, Paris, Chicago, New York, Hong Kong, and Dubai.

FWB Frankfurter Wertpapierbörse (Frankfurt Stock Exchange), is one of the world's largest trading centers for securities. With a share in turnover of around 90%, it is the largest of the German stock exchanges. Deutsche Börse AG operates the Frankfurt Stock Exchange. Deutsche Börse is the owner of Clearstream, a clearing house based in Luxembourg.

Despite the COVID-19 pandemic, Deutsche Börse was able to increase its turnover by 15% and its net revenue by 9% in 2020 compared to 2019. In addition, Deutsche Börse's workforce grew by 463 employees in 2020.

=== Mergers and acquisitions ===
On 3 May 2000, it was announced that the London Stock Exchange would merge with Deutsche Börse, though the deal fell through before the merger could be realized.

In 2001, Deutsche Börse tried again to merge with the London Stock Exchange, followed by a takeover bid in late 2004, but both offers were rejected by the LSE. After CEO Werner Seifert was forced to resign by the main shareholders in 2005, Deutsche Börse changed plans and entered into advanced negotiations for a merger with Euronext which would have brought two of the biggest stock exchanges in Europe into one holding. The New York Stock Exchange beat out Deutsche Börse's final bid for Euronext in 2006.

Since 2007, Deutsche Börse operates the joint venture Scoach with SIX Swiss Exchange to provide a European derivative trading platform. In July 2015, Deutsche Börse bought the 360T company for €725 million and also acquired all shares (100%) of the joint venture STOXX AG for a purchase price of CHF 650 million from the SIX Group. On September 16, 2019, Deutsche Börse has announced its acquisition of Axioma Inc. which was combined with STOXX and DAX to form Qontigo. As part of the transaction, Deutsche Börse has entered into a strategic partnership with General Atlantic, a global equity firm. In March 2022, Deutsche Börse announced the acquisition of 100% of Luxembourg-based fund data manager Kneip. In April 2023, Deutsche Börse agreed to buy Danish investment management software firm SimCorp for €3.9 billion. As part of this transaction, the former Axioma part of Qontigo was integrated with SimCorp, while the STOXX and DAX divisions were included in a new subsidiary ISS STOXX. In August 2023, Deutsche Börse announced the acquisition of the Luxembourg-based distributed ledger technology company, FundsDLT.

=== Attempted NYSE Euronext merger ===
On 7 December 2008, Deutsche Börse rebuffed rumors that it might join with NYSE Euronext (the company formed as a result of the merger of NYSE and Euronext) to create the world's leading stock exchange. While the company claims that it pursued the matter, on 8 December 2008, it reported that talks which began on 25 November 2008, were closed without any result due to differences in valuation of the company.

Deutsche Börse had also considered the acquisition again in 2009. On 9 February 2011, reports suggested that NYSE Euronext and Deutsche Börse were in advanced talks about an all-stock merger. Deutsche Börse was in advanced talks to buy NYSE Euronext in a deal that would create the world's largest trading powerhouse. The shares of both companies were temporarily frozen on the news due to the risk of large price movements and clarifications of the deal. A successful deal would see the new company becoming the world's largest stock exchange operator with a market capitalisation of listed companies equal to US$15 trillion, US$13.39 trillion of which is part of the much larger NYSE Euronext, which is approximately six times the size of Deutsche Börse.

President and deputy CEO of NYSE Euronext Dominique Cerutti would become the new company's president and head of commercial and internal technology. Roland Bellegarde, also of NYSE Euronext, would become the head of European cash equities. The new company would potentially have €300 million (US$410 million) in cost savings. However, the merger would be subject to review in both the United States and European Union under concerns it could create a "de facto monopoly". NYSE Euronext shareholders approved the Deutsche Börse's all-stock deal on 7 July 2011, and Deutsche Börse shareholders had accepted the deal by 15 July 2011.

On 22 December 2011, Deutsche Boerse won U.S. antitrust approval to buy NYSE Euronext, on the condition that a Deutsche Börse subsidiary, the International Securities Exchange, divest its 31.5% interest in Direct Edge. NYSE Euronext and Deutsche Boerse AG delayed the deadline for completing their merger until 31 March 2012, as the exchange operators try to persuade European regulators to approve the deal.

The European Commission blocked the merger on 1 February 2012, citing the fact that the merged company would have a near monopoly. This measure taken by the EC is the fourth blocking in over a decade. The commission rejected the merger on antitrust grounds, saying the combined businesses would dominate Europe's on-exchange derivatives trading with an estimated 93% market share. "This is a black day for Europe and its global competitiveness on financial markets", said former Deutsche Börse chief executive Reto Francioni. NYSE Euronext chairman Jan-Michiel Hessels said: "While we are disappointed and strongly disagree with the EU decision, which is based on a fundamentally different understanding of the derivatives market, it is now time to move on".

=== Failed merger with London Stock Exchange Group ===
In March 2016, the company announced it had reached an agreement with London Stock Exchange Group to merge. The companies were to be brought under a new holding company, with a temporary placeholder name of UK TopCo, and would have retained both headquarters in London and Frankfurt. The deal needed approval from regulators in the European Union, the U.S. and Russia. The London Stock Exchange said Russian approval was needed because it owns Exactpro, a firm with offices in Russia specializing in quality assurance for exchanges and financial organizations. The European Commission opened an in-depth investigation into the proposed Deutsche Börse/LSEG merger on 28 September 2016. The European Commission delayed its decision on the deal by 15 working days to 6 March 2017. LSEG planned to hive off the French half of its LCH SA arm in a bid to ease EU concerns about the deal, although the companies had not formally submitted any concessions to the commission.

In February 2017, the Commission required that the parties commit to the divestment of LSEG's majority stake in fixed-income sovereign bond trading platform MTS S.p.A. LSEG stated it would not sell MTS in Italy to appease anti-trust concerns. The planned merger between the two exchanges, which was estimated to create the largest exchange in Europe, was subsequently described as "at risk" by The Wall Street Journal. The merger attempt was blocked by EU Competition Regulator on 29 March 2017 stating that "The Commission's investigation concluded the merger would have created a de facto monopoly in the markets for clearing fixed income instruments".

=== Recent ===
In October 2017, two institutional shareholders, who at the time held more than 6.5% of Deutsche Börse, called for the resignation of the chairman. On 16 November 2017, Theodor Weimer was appointed as new CEO of Deutsche Börse AG, effective January 2018.

In September 2024, the European Commission said it had carried out unannounced inspections at the offices of Deutsche Börse over potential anti-competitive practices. On 6 November 2025, the Commission officially opened an investigation into possible collusion between Nasdaq and Deutsche Börse over the listing, trading and clearing of financial derivatives; this probe follows the unannounced inspections at Nasdaq and Deutsche Börse in September 2024.

=== Allfunds Acquisition ===
In January 2026, Deutsche Börse agreed to acquire wealth management company Allfunds for €5.3 billion (~$6.19 billion). The deal was structured as a cash and stock deal and Allfunds shareholders are entitled to further dividends pending results. The deal was expected to close by 1H 2027.

== Finances ==
	2019	2020	2021	2022	2023	2024	2025
Total revenue (€ millions)	3,585	3,983	4,630	5,798	7,835	8,943	8,540
Operating income (€ millions)	1,490	1,608	1,688	2,193	2,629	2,905	3,003
Net income (€ millions)	1,004	1,080	1,210	1,494	1,724	1,948	1,995
Total assets (€ millions)	137,237	152,864	223,132	269,310	237,970	222,396	297,386
Total equity (€ millions)	6,111	6,556	7,742	9,061	10,100	11,259	11,829
Employees	6,775	7,238	10,200	11,078	14,502	15,495	16,475

== Art collection ==
Deutsche Börse Group is a major sponsor of contemporary photography. In 1999, the Group established the Art Collection Deutsche Börse, which today comprises more than 900 mostly large size works from around 90 international artists. In 2005, the stock exchange became the sponsor of the annually awarded Deutsche Börse Photography Prize of the Photographers' Gallery in London, which was started up in 1996 by the gallery, to promote the best work by contemporary photographers.

== Charity involvement ==
Deutsche Börse Group have participated in and sponsored many events, including Futures For Kids Annual Football Tournament (held in the London Docklands, England). The event raised £2.6 million for charity and included firms such as Marex Spectron, Trading Technologies, Futex, Oak Futures and the London Metal Exchange.

== See also ==
- Deutsche Börse Cloud Exchange AG
